= Gastrointestinal wall =

Digestive system structure

The gastrointestinal wall of the gastrointestinal tract is made up of four layers of specialised tissue. From the inner cavity of the gut (the lumen) outwards, these are the mucosa, the submucosa, the muscular layer and the serosa or adventitia.

The mucosa is the innermost layer of the gastrointestinal tract. It surrounds the lumen of the tract and comes into direct contact with digested food (chyme). The mucosa itself is made up of three layers: the epithelium, where most digestive, absorptive and secretory processes occur; the lamina propria, a layer of connective tissue, and the muscularis mucosae, a thin layer of smooth muscle.

The submucosa contains nerves including the submucous plexus (also called Meissner's plexus), blood vessels and elastic fibres with collagen, that stretches with increased capacity but maintains the shape of the intestine.

The muscular layer surrounds the submucosa. It comprises layers of smooth muscle in longitudinal and circular orientation that also helps with continued bowel movements (peristalsis) and the movement of digested material out of and along the gut. In between the two layers of muscle lies the myenteric plexus (also called plexus).

The serosa/adventitia are the final layers. These are made up of loose connective tissue and coated in mucus so as to prevent any friction damage from the intestine rubbing against other tissue. The serosa is present if the tissue is within the peritoneum, and the adventitia if the tissue is retroperitoneal.

== Structure ==
The general structure of the intestinal wall

When viewed under the microscope, the gastrointestinal wall has a consistent general form, but with certain parts differing along its course.

=== Intestinal mucosa ===
The intestinal mucosa is the innermost mucous membrane of the gastrointestinal tract. It surrounds the cavity (lumen) of the tract and comes into direct contact with digested food (chyme). The mucosa is made up of three layers:

- The epithelium is the innermost layer. It is where most digestive, absorptive and secretory processes occur.
- The lamina propria, the underlying layer of loose connective tissue within the mucosa.
- The muscularis mucosae, a thin layer of smooth muscle.

The epithelium, the most exposed part of the mucosa, is a glandular epithelium with many goblet cells. Goblet cells secrete mucus, which lubricates the passage of food along and protects the intestinal wall from digestive enzymes. In the small intestine, villi are folds of the mucosa that increase the surface area of the intestine. The villi contain a lacteal, a vessel connected to the lymph system that aids in the removal of lipids and tissue fluids. Microvilli are present on the epithelium of a villus and further increase the surface area over which absorption can take place. Numerous intestinal glands as pocket-like invaginations are present in the underlying tissue. In the large intestines, villi are absent and a flat surface with thousands of glands is observed. Underlying the epithelium is the lamina propria, which contains myofibroblasts, blood vessels, nerves, and several different immune cells, and the muscularis mucosa which is a layer of smooth muscle that aids in the action of continued peristalsis and catastalsis along the gut.

==== Cells of the small intestinal mucosa ====
Cell type	Location in the mucosa	Function
Absorptive cell	Epithelium/intestinal glands	Digestion and absorption of nutrients in chyme
Goblet cell	Epithelium/intestinal glands	Secretion of mucus
Paneth cell	Intestinal glands	Secretion of the bactericidal enzyme lysozyme; phagocytosis
G cells	Intestinal glands of duodenum	Secretion of the hormone intestinal gastrin
I cells	Intestinal glands of duodenum	Secretion of the hormone cholecystokinin, which stimulates release of pancreatic juices and bile
K cells	Intestinal glands	Secretion of the hormone glucose-dependent insulinotropic peptide, which stimulates the release of insulin
M cells	Intestinal glands of duodenum and jejunum	Secretion of the hormone motilin, which accelerates gastric emptying, stimulates intestinal peristalsis, and stimulates the production of pepsin
S cells	Intestinal glands	Secretion of the hormone secretin

==== Epithelium ====
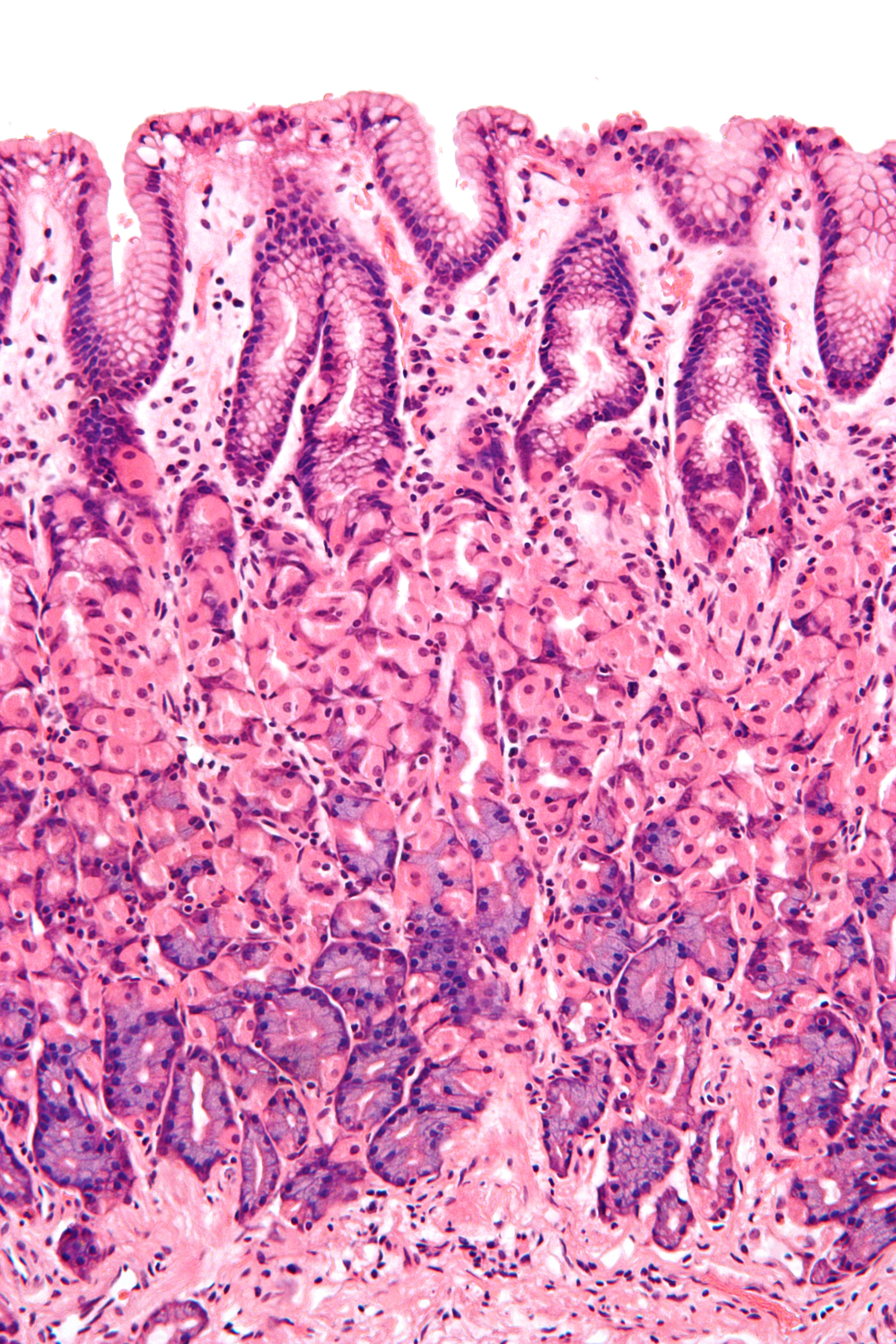
Image of the mucosa of the stomach, showing an epithelium (at top, and also facing the elongated cavities) made up of column-shaped cells.

The epithelial lining of the mucosa, differs along the gastrointestinal tract. The epithelium is described as stratified if it consists of multiple layers of cells, and simple if it is made up of one layer of cells. Terms used to describe the shape of the cells in it - columnar if column-shaped, and squamous if flat.

- In the oesophagus, pharynx and external anal canal the epithelium is stratified, squamous and non-keratinising, for protective purposes.
- In the stomach, the epithelium is simple columnar, and is organised into gastric pits and glands to deal with secretion.
- In the small intestine, epithelium is simple columnar and specialised for absorption. It is organised into plicae circulares and villi, and the enterocytes have microvilli. The microvilli create a brush border that increases the area for absorption. In the ileum there are occasionally Peyer's patches in the lamina propria. Brunner's glands are found in the duodenum but not in other parts of the small intestine.
- In the colon, epithelium is simple columnar and without villi. Goblet cells, which secrete mucus, are also present.
- The appendix has a mucosa resembling the colon but is heavily infiltrated with lymphocytes.

Transition between the different types of epithelium occurs at the junction between the oesophagus and stomach; between the stomach and duodenum, between the ileum and caecum, and at the pectinate line of the anus.

=== Submucosa ===
The submucosa consists of a dense and irregular layer of connective tissue with blood vessels, lymphatics, and nerves branching into the mucosa and muscular layer. It contains the submucous plexus, and enteric nervous plexus, situated on the inner surface of the muscular layer.

=== Muscular layer ===
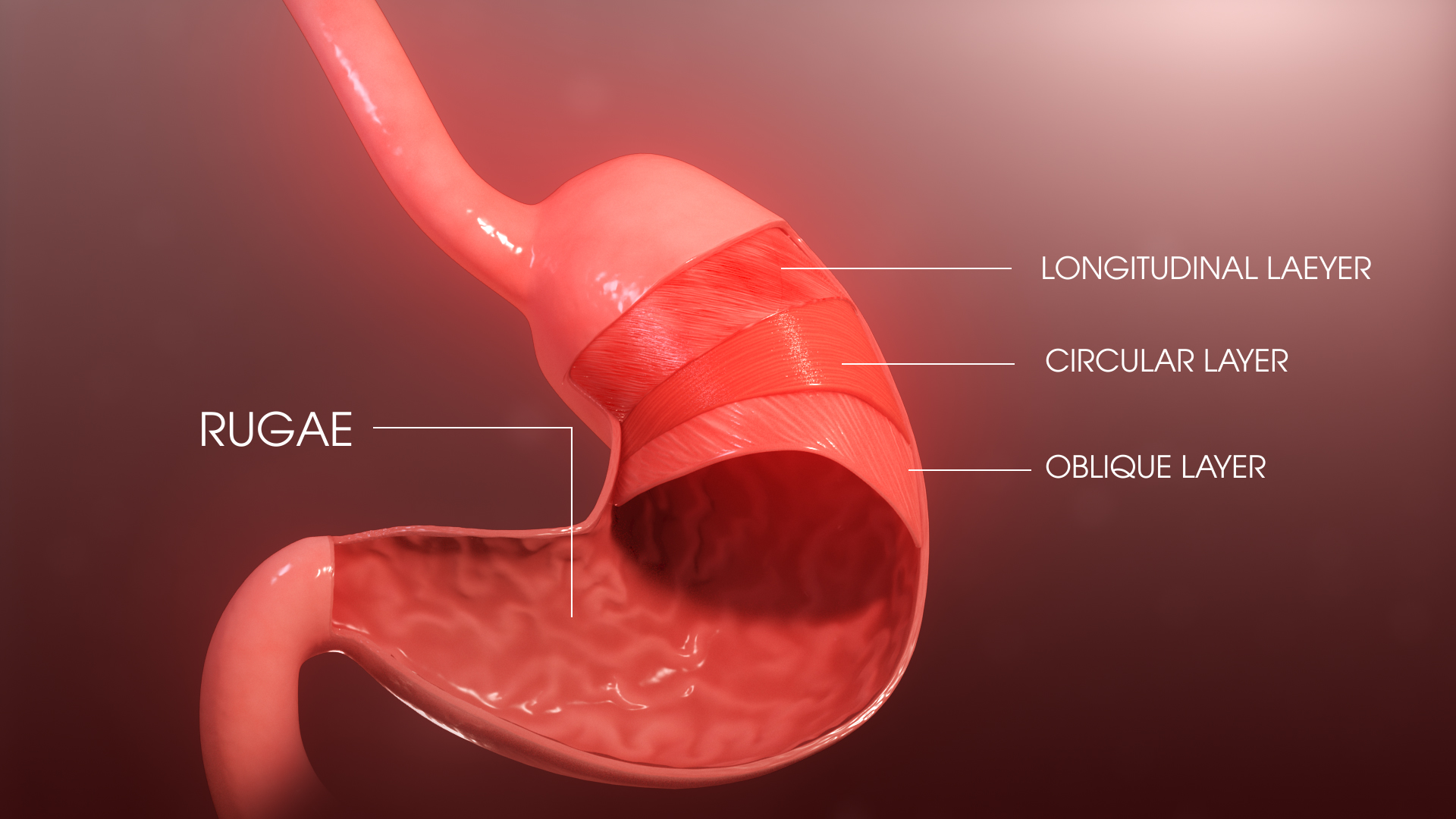
Muscular layers of the stomach wall.

The muscular layer consists of two layers of muscle, the inner and outer layer. The muscle of the inner layer is arranged in circular rings around the tract, whereas the muscle of the outer layer is arranged longitudinally. The stomach has an extra layer, an inner oblique muscular layer. Between the two muscle layers is the myenteric plexus (Auerbach's plexus). This controls peristalsis. Activity is initiated by the pacemaker cells (interstitial cells of Cajal). The gut has intrinsic peristaltic activity (basal electrical rhythm) due to its self-contained enteric nervous system. The rate can, of course, be modulated by the rest of the autonomic nervous system.

The layers are not truly longitudinal or circular, rather the layers of muscle are helical with different pitches. The inner circular is helical with a steep pitch and the outer longitudinal is helical with a much shallower pitch.

The coordinated contractions of these layers is called peristalsis and propels the food through the tract. Food in the GI tract is called a bolus (ball of food) from the mouth down to the stomach. After the stomach, the food is partially digested and semi-liquid, and is referred to as chyme. In the large intestine the remaining semi-solid substance is referred to as faeces. The circular muscle layer prevents food from travelling backward and the longitudinal layer shortens the tract.

The thickness of the muscular layer varies in each part of the tract:

- In the colon, for example, the muscular layer is much thicker because the faeces are large and heavy and require more force to push along. The outer longitudinal layer of the colon thins out into 3 discontinuous longitudinal bands, known as taeniae coli (bands of the colon). This is one of the 3 features helping to distinguish between the large and small intestine.
- Occasionally in the large intestine (2-3 times a day), there will be mass contraction of certain segments, moving a lot of faeces along. This is generally when one gets the urge to defecate.
- The pylorus of the stomach has a thickened portion of the inner circular layer: the pyloric sphincter. Alone among the GI tract, the stomach has a third layer of muscular layer. This is the inner oblique layer and helps churn the chyme in the stomach.

=== Serosa and adventitia ===
The outermost layer of the gastrointestinal wall consists of several layers of connective tissue and is either of serosa (below the diaphragm) or adventitia above the diaphragm.

Regions of the gastrointestinal tract within the peritoneum (called Intraperitoneal) are covered with serosa. This structure consists of connective tissue covered by a simple squamous epithelium, called the mesothelium, which reduces frictional forces during digestive movements. The intraperitoneal regions include most of the stomach, first part of the duodenum, all of the small intestine, caecum and appendix, transverse colon, sigmoid colon and rectum. In these sections of the gut there is clear boundary between the gut and the surrounding tissue. These parts of the tract have a mesentery.

Regions of the gastrointestinal tract behind the peritoneum (called retroperitoneal) are covered with adventitia. They blend into the surrounding tissue and are fixed in position (for example, the retroperitoneal section of the duodenum usually passes through the transpyloric plane). The retroperitoneal regions include the oral cavity, esophagus, pylorus of the stomach, distal duodenum, ascending colon, descending colon and anal canal.

== Clinical significance ==
The gastrointestinal wall can be affected in a number of conditions.

An ulcer is something that's eroded through the epithelium of the wall. Ulcers that affect the tract include peptic ulcers and perforated ulcer is one that has eroded completely through the layers.

The gastrointestinal wall is inflamed in a number of conditions. This is called esophagitis, gastritis, duodenitis, ileitis, and colitis depending on the parts affected. It can be due to infections or other conditions, including coeliac disease, and inflammatory bowel disease affects the layers of the gastrointestinal tract in different ways. Ulcerative colitis involves the colonic mucosa. Crohn's disease may produce inflammation in all layers in any part of the gastrointestinal tract and so can result in transmural fistulae.

Invasion of tumours through the layers of the gastrointestinal wall is used in staging of tumour spread. This affects treatment and prognosis.

The normal thickness of the small intestinal wall is 3–5 mm, and 1–5 mm in the large intestine. Focal, irregular and asymmetrical gastrointestinal wall thickening suggests a malignancy. Segmental or diffuse gastrointestinal wall thickening is most often due to ischemic, inflammatory or infectious disease.

== Additional images ==
General organisation of GI tract

The wall of the stomach.

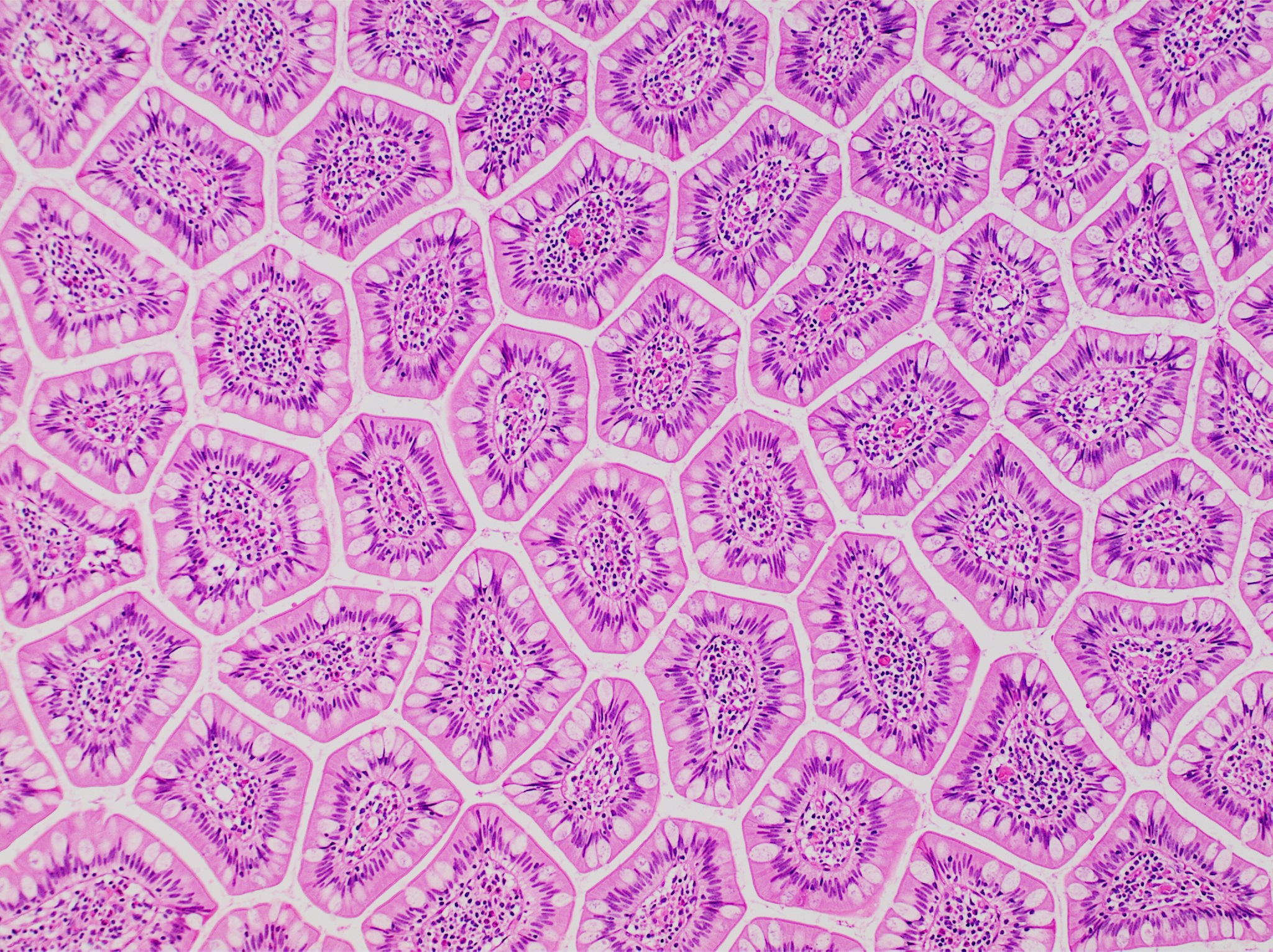
Cross-section histology of intestinal villi of the human terminal ileum.
