= Subserosa =

Thin layer of tissue in the walls of various organs

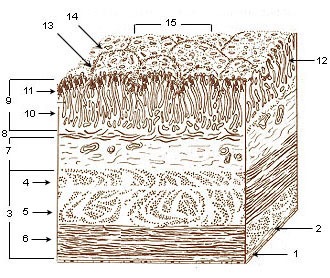
- Layers of Stomach Wall: 1. Serosa; 2. Muscularis; 3. Oblique fibers of muscle wall 4. Circular muscle layer 5. Longitudinal muscle layer 6. Submucosa; 7. Lamina muscularis mucosae 8. Mucosa; 9. Lamina propria 10. Epithelium; 11. Gastric glands 12. Gastric pits 13. Villous folds 14. Gastric areas (gastric surface)

Identifiers
- TA98: A12.1.08.009; A05.4.01.008; A05.5.01.020; A05.6.01.003; A05.7.01.003; A05.8.01.053; A05.8.02.007; A07.1.02.004; A07.1.02.011; A08.3.01.009; A09.1.02.011; A09.1.03.024; A09.3.01.015; A10.1.02.004
- TA2: 2900, 2908, 2935, 2965, 3057, 3324, 3344, 3408, 3496, 3519, 3586, 3731
- FMA: 45636

The subserosa or tela subserosa, is a thin layer of tissue in the walls of various organs. It is a layer of connective tissue (usually of the areolar type) between the muscular layer (muscularis externa) and the serosa (serous membrane).

The subserosa has clinical importance particularly in cancer staging (for example, in staging stomach cancer or uterine cancer).

The subserosa (sub- + serosa) is to a serous membrane what the submucosa (sub- + mucosa) is to a mucous membrane.
