= Gastric pits =

Indentations in the stomach

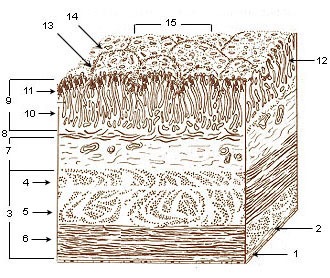
- Layers of Stomach Wall: 1. Serosa; 2. Tela subserosa 3. Muscularis; 4. Oblique fibers of muscle wall 5. Circular muscle layer 6. Longitudinal muscle layer 7. Submucosa; 8. Lamina muscularis mucosae 9. Mucosa; 10. Lamina propria 11. Epithelium; 12. Gastric glands 13. Gastric pits 14. Villous folds 15. Gastric areas (gastric surface)

Details

Identifiers
- Latin: foveolae gastricae
- TA98: A05.5.01.032
- TA2: 2918
- FMA: 76583

Gastric pits are indentations in the stomach which denote entrances to 3-5 tubular gastric glands. They are deeper in the pylorus than they are in the other parts of the stomach. The human stomach has several million of these pits which dot the surface of the lining epithelium. Surface mucous cells line the pits themselves but give way to a series of other types of cells which then line the glands themselves.

== Gastric juice ==
Gastric juice, containing gastric acid, is secreted from gastric glands, which are located in gastric pits. Gastric juice contains hydrochloric acid, pepsinogen and mucus. Hydrochloric acid is secreted by parietal cells, pepsinogen is secreted by gastric chief cells and mucus is secreted by mucous neck cells.
