= Gastric mucosa =

Mucous membrane layer of the stomach

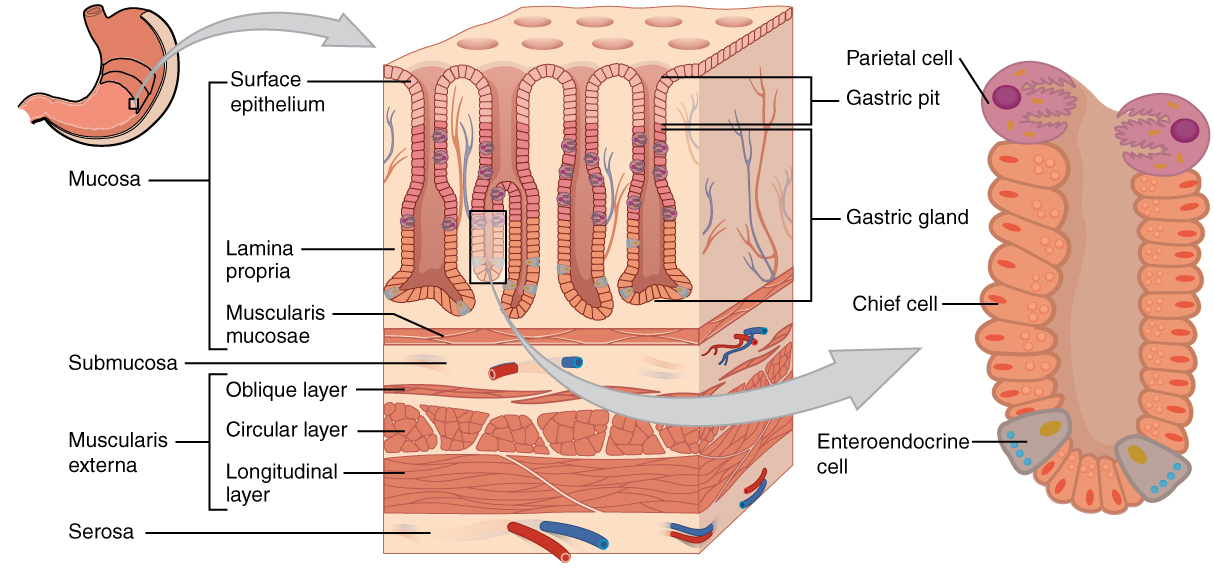
- Mucosa and glands of stomach

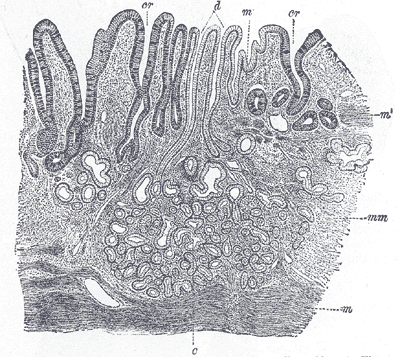
- Section of mucous membrane of human stomach, near the cardiac orifice. X 45. c. Cardiac glands. d. Their ducts. cr. Gland similar to the intestinal glands, with goblet cells. mm. Mucous membrane. m. Muscularis mucosæ. m’. Muscular tissue within the mucous membrane.

Details

Identifiers
- Latin: mucosa gastris
- MeSH: D005753
- TA98: A05.5.01.027
- TA2: 2914
- FMA: 14907

Diagram of the alkaline mucous layer in the stomach with mucosal defense mechanisms

The gastric mucosa is the mucous membrane layer that lines the entire stomach. The mucus is secreted by gastric glands, and surface mucous cells in the mucosa to protect the stomach wall from harmful gastric acid, and from digestive enzymes that may start to digest the tissue of the wall. Mucus from the glands is mainly secreted by pyloric glands in the lower region of the stomach, and by a smaller amount in the parietal glands in the body and fundus of the stomach.

The mucosa is studded with millions of gastric pits, which the gastric glands empty into. In humans, it is about one millimetre thick, and its surface is smooth, and soft. It consists of simple secretory columnar epithelium, an underlying supportive layer of loose connective tissue called the lamina propria, and the muscularis mucosae, a thin layer of muscle that separates the mucosa from the underlying submucosa. The gastric mucosa serves as a gastric barrier, reinforced by tight junctions between the epithelial cells.

Three types of cell in the mucosa secrete mucus. Mucus cells in the pyloric glands produce a large amount of thin mucus. mucous neck cells produce mucus in the parietal glands. Surface mucous cells (foveolar cells), cover the entire mucosa between the gastric pits and into their upper parts, the mucus produced here is viscid, and alkaline.

== Description ==
The gastric mucosa is the mucous membrane layer that lines the entire stomach. In its fresh state, it is pink at the pyloric end, and red or reddish-brown over the rest of its surface. In infancy it is of a brighter hue, the vascular redness being more marked.

It is thin at the cardiac extremity, but thicker toward the pylorus. During the contracted state of the stomach it is thrown into numerous folds or rugae, which, for the most part, have a longitudinal direction. They are most marked along the greater curvature, and toward the pyloric end, and are entirely obliterated when the stomach is stretched by a meal.

Viewed under a microscope, the inner surface of the mucous membrane presents a peculiar honeycomb appearance from being covered with funnel-like polygonal or hexagonal depressions which vary from 0.12 to 0.25 mm. in diameter. These are the ducts of the gastric glands, at the bottom of each may be seen one or more minute openings of the gland tubes. Gastric glands are simple or branched tubular glands that emerge on the deeper part of the gastric pits, and outlined by the folds of the mucosa.

== Gastric glands ==
The gastric glands in the cardiac region of the stomach are known as cardiac glands, in the pyloric region the glands are known as pyloric glands, and in the rest of the stomach they are called gastric glands.

Several types of endocrine cells are found in the gastric glands. The pyloric glands contain gastrin-producing cells (G cells); this hormone stimulates acid production from the parietal cells. Enterochromaffin-like cells (ECLs), found in the oxyntic glands release histamine, which also is a powerful stimulant of the acid secretion.

== Surface ==
The surface of the mucous membrane is covered by a single layer of columnar epithelium. This epithelium commences very abruptly at the cardiac orifice, where there is a sudden transition from the stratified epithelium of the esophagus. The epithelial lining of the gland ducts is of the same character and is continuous with the general epithelial lining of the stomach.

The sodium-iodide symporter (NIS) is expressed in all the surface mucous cells (at the basolateral membrane) but not in the mucous neck cells. SIP mediates the transport of iodide from the bloodstream and secretes it into the gastric lumen where it is taken up in the gastric juice. Its role is not known but it has been shown to be absent in gastric cancer.

== Clinical significance ==
Long-term use of proton-pump inhibitors (PPIs) that reduce the secretion of gastric acid, even from 10 months, has been found to be associated with some serious adverse effects including different kidney diseases, cardiovascular disease including heart attack, and stroke, liver cancer, bone fractures, infection including from clostridioides difficile, community-acquired pneumonia, nutrient deficiencies, dementia, and gastric cancer. Other studies have shown long-term PPI use to cause gastric mucosal lesions including various polyps.

Rapid repair of the gastric mucosa, known as gastric mucosal restitution is an essential process of repair in response to gastric damage.

Gastritis is inflammation of the stomach lining that can be acute or chronic.

Tumors of the stomach arise from the cells of the gastric mucosa and can be benign or malignant.

== See also ==
· ·
- Enterochromaffin-like cell
- Foveolar cell
- Gastric chief cell
- Parietal cell
