= Muscularis =

Muscularis may refer to:

- Muscularis mucosae
- Muscularis externa or muscular layer
