= Submucosal =

Submucosal may refer to:

- Submucous plexus
- Submucosa
