= Tumors of the stomach =

Benign or malignant neoplasm involving the stomach

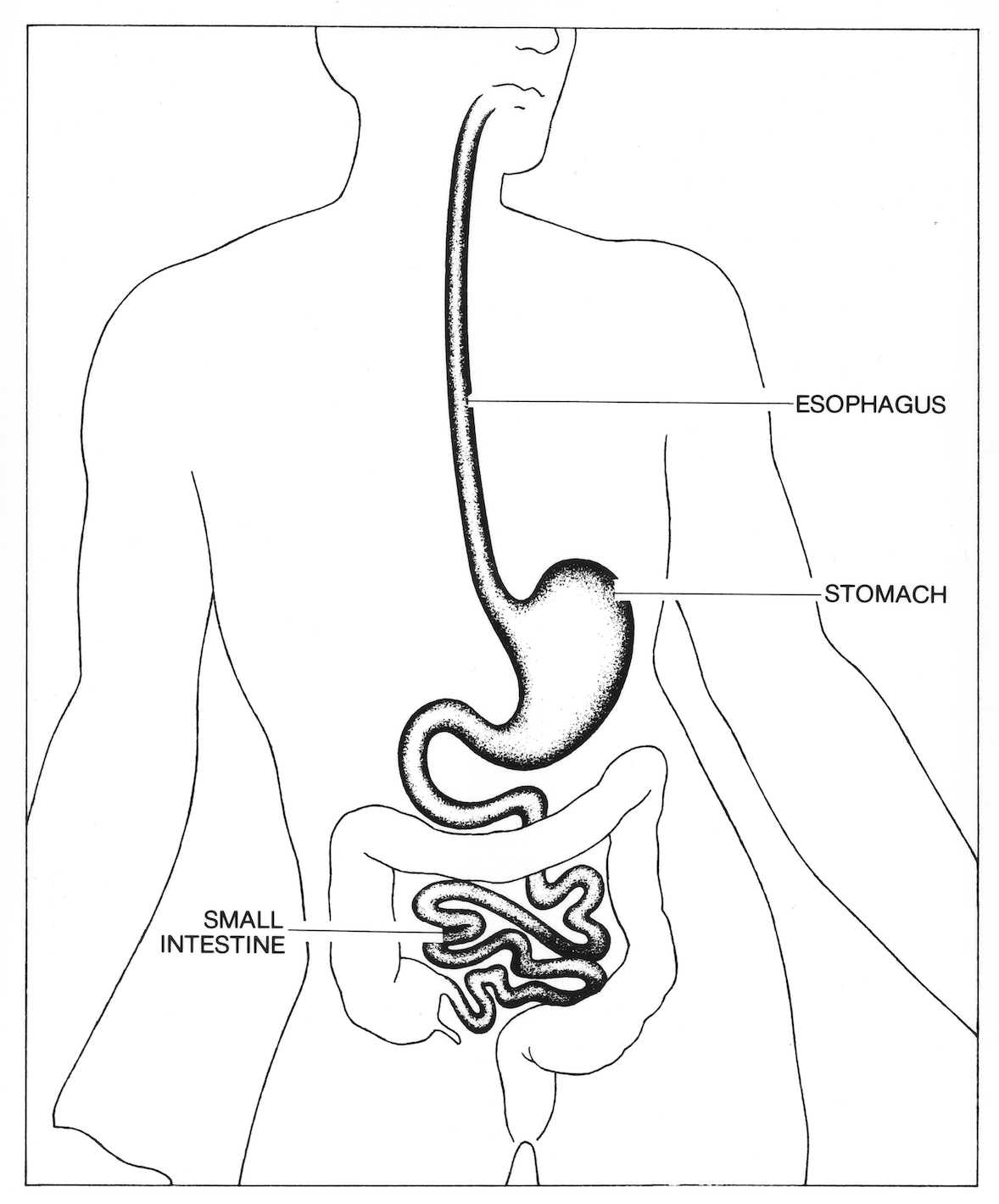
The stomach is an organ of the gastrointestinal tract that sits in the abdomen.

Tumors of the stomach are known as gastric tumors, and can be either benign or malignant (gastric cancer). These tumors arise from the cells of the gastric mucosa, which lines the stomach. Typically, most gastric tumors are cancerous and not detected until a later stage for various reasons.

== Types ==
There are two distinct types of tumors: benign and malignant. Both types of tumors share several general characteristics, the broadest being that they are an abnormal proliferation of cells. The main difference between the two types is what happens once the tumor has started growing. In a benign tumor, the proliferated cells stay in one location, where they do not impact or spread to other surrounding tissues. Malignant tumors, on the other hand, are capable of spreading throughout the entire body, causing new tumors to appear. This process is called metastasis, and is a hallmark of cancerous tumors.

=== Typical cell growth ===
Generally speaking, all cells grow and divide to help the organism grow larger or to replace dead or damaged cells. Depending on the type of cell, they either go through mitosis or meiosis, creating diploid or haploid daughter cells, respectively. In cells that complete mitosis, after they divide, they enter a phase called interphase. Interphase is the longest part of the cell cycle and is composed of G1, S, and G2 phases. During this time, the cell completes a series of growth, DNA replication, and more growth to ensure they are ready to divide again eventually.

To make sure this cycle runs smoothly, there is a series of checkpoints that the cell reaches to ensure that DNA replication has been completed correctly and that the cell is of the correct size. These checkpoints include an un-replicated DNA checkpoint, a spindle assembly checkpoint, a chromosome-segregation checkpoint, and various DNA damage checkpoints. Table 1 below describes different cell cycle checkpoints and their various purposes.

Table 1: cell cycle checkpoints
Checkpoint name	When it occurs	What it looks for
Un-Replicated DNA Checkpoint	This checkpoint occurs at the end of the G2 phase	This checkpoint looks to see if all of the cell's DNA has been replicated
Spindle Assembly Checkpoint	This checkpoint occurs during mitosis or meiosis	This checkpoint looks to see if all spindle fibers have been properly formed, as well as ensuring that the chromosomes are aligned in the correct location
Chromosome-Segregation Checkpoint	This checkpoint occurs right before telophase	This checkpoint checks to see that each pair of chromosomes has been correctly separated
DNA Damage Checkpoint 1	This checkpoint occurs at the end of the G1phase	This checkpoint checks to see if there has been any damage to the cell's DNA during the G1 phase
DNA Damage Checkpoint 2	This checkpoint occurs just before the beginning of the S phase	This checkpoint checks to see if there has been any damage to the cell's DNA during the G1 phase
DNA Damage Checkpoint 3	This checkpoint occurs during the S phase	This checkpoint checks to see if there has been any damage to the cell's DNA during the S phase
DNA Damage Checkpoint 4	This checkpoint occurs during the G2 phase	This checkpoint checks to see if there has been any damage to the cell's DNA during the G2 phase

In mammalian organisms, the cell cycle is regulated through interactions of cyclin-dependent kinases (CDKs) and cyclins. CDKs are always present in the cell, while cyclins are in a constant cycle of degradation and synthesis. Although CDKs are always present in a cell, their natural state is in the inactive form, which is where the cyclins come into play. In a normal cell, each phase of the cell cycle will produce unique types of cyclins, which bind to specific cyclin-dependent kinases at each checkpoint. Once they are bound, the complex is now activated, and the CDK can proceed with phosphorylation.

Checkpoints that monitor for DNA damage are regulated in a slightly different manner. They still involve the use of cyclins and CDKs, but they also involve the use of a transcription factor called p53, a crucial part of cell cycle regulation. In a cell where everything has proceeded normally, p53 will be degraded and have essentially no function. If, however, there is any damage, p53 will become stabilized, allowing it to bind to the damaged DNA. In this case, the cell cycle will halt long enough for the damage to be repaired, or if the damage is severe enough, the cell will undergo apoptosis.

=== Abnormal cell growth ===
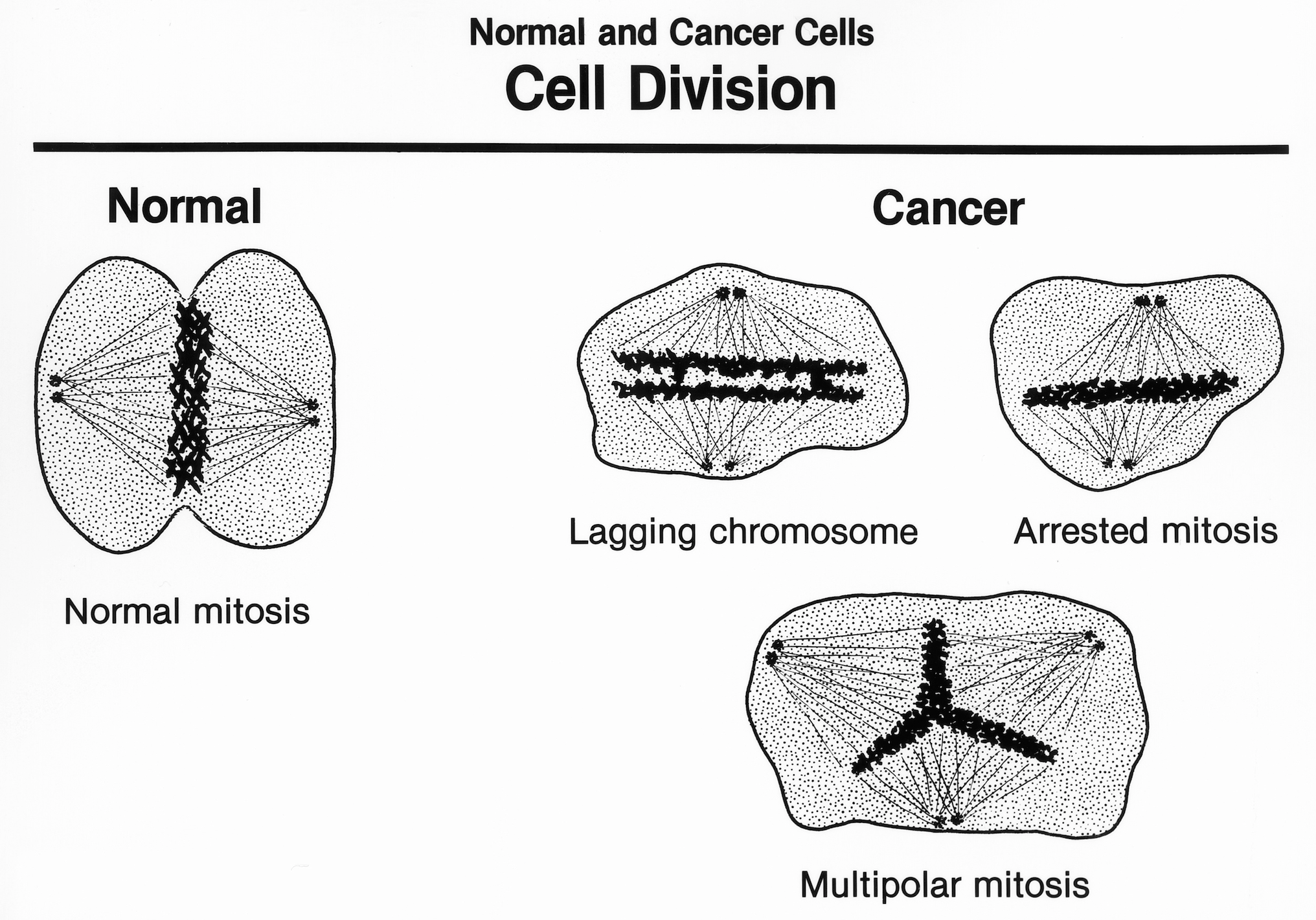
This image depicts the division of normal cells versus the division of cancerous cells.

In the case of tumors, the cells display a level of abnormal growth. In most cases, this abnormal growth comes from an error in the cell cycle checkpoints. Three general errors occur within the cell cycle to cause abnormal cell growth. The first error is unscheduled proliferation, which essentially refers to the cell continuing to grow and divide without the proper signaling from mitosis. Genomic instability, the second error, refers to mutations within the genome that cause errors in the replication or repair of the gene. Lastly, chromosomal instability is caused by mutations that disrupt the normal segregation of chromosomes in mitosis or meiosis. Although caused by different abnormalities, each of these errors is in some way mediated by a mistake in cyclin-dependent kinases. In a healthy cell, the interactions between cyclins and cyclin-dependent kinases are essential for either halting the cell cycle or allowing the cell to continue through a checkpoint. In abnormal cells, however, acquired mutations allow the cells to bypass these checkpoints by deregulating the cyclins and CDKs, even if there have been significant errors.

== Tumor growth in the stomach ==
Although it is possible to have a tumor that is benign, in the case of gastric tumors, only about 5-10% end up being non-cancerous.

=== Origins of gastric tumors ===
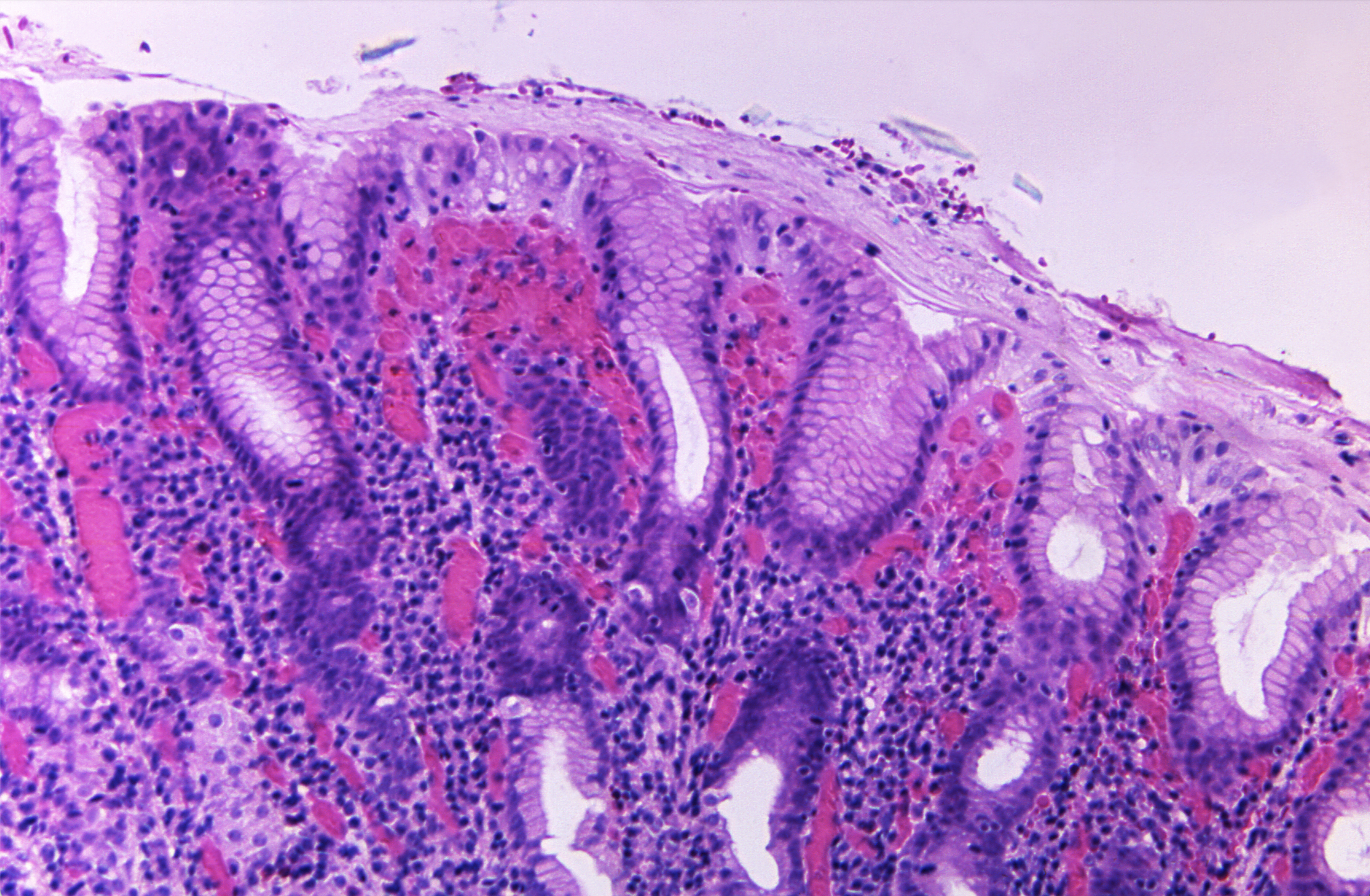
A microscopic view of stomach lining containing goblet cells, parietal cells, chief cells, and enteroendocrine cells.

Unfortunately, the early anatomical changes in the lining of the stomach that lead to cancer are rarely noticeable. The lining of the stomach is made up of a simple columnar epithelium which folds into what are called gastric glands. Within these glands are four different cell types: goblet cells, parietal cells, chief cells, and enteroendocrine cells. Mutations in any of these cell types can begin the process of uncontrolled cell proliferation, ultimately leading to the formation of a tumor. It is also important to note that depending on where in the stomach the tumor starts, signs and symptoms, as well as treatment options, may differ.

=== Types of gastric tumors ===
1. Adenocarcinoma
2. Primary Gastric Lymphoma
3. Gastrointestinal Stromal Tumor (GIST)
4. Neuroendocrine (Carcinoid) Tumors

=== Risk factors ===
- Smoking
- Helicobacter pylori infection.
- A diet low in fruits and vegetables.
- A diet high in salt and nitrates.
- Polyps
- Genetic alterations – p53 mutation, microsatellite instability, E-cadherin gene
- Previous radiation
- Pernicious anaemia

=== Signs and symptoms ===
- Dysphagia
- Indigestion
- Nausea
- Vomiting
  - Vomiting blood
- Abdominal pain
- Loss of appetite
- Abdominal swelling
- Passing black stool
