= Foveolar cell =

Mucus-producing cells in stomach lining protective against gastric acid

Foveolar cells
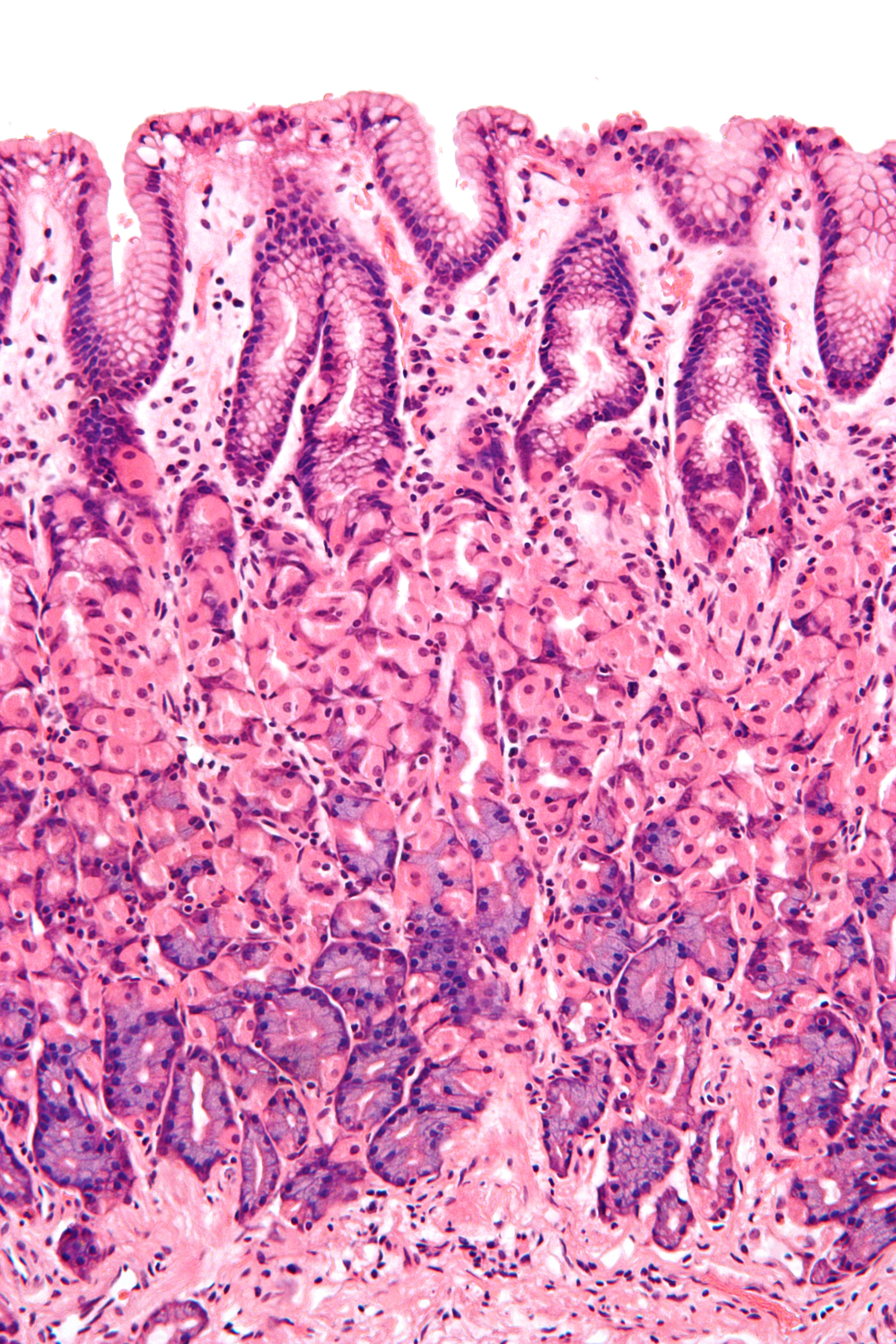
- Microscopic section of gastric mucosa. Foveolar cells can be seen at top of the image lining the surface and pits

Details
- Location: Stomach
- Function: Mucus production

Identifiers
- Latin: mucocytus superficialis
- TH: H3.04.02.1.00023

Foveolar cells or surface mucous cells are mucus-producing cells which cover the inside of the stomach, protecting it from the corrosive nature of gastric acid. (Note: "Mucous" is an adjective whereas "mucus" is a noun, i.e. mucous cells secrete mucus.) These cells line the gastric mucosa and the gastric pits. Mucous neck cells are found in the necks of the gastric glands. The mucus-secreting cells of the stomach can be distinguished histologically from the intestinal goblet cells, another type of mucus-secreting cell.

== Structure ==
The gastric mucosa that lines the inner wall of the stomach has a set of microscopic features called gastric glands which, depending on the location within the stomach, secrete different substances into the lumen of the organ. The openings of these glands into the stomach are called gastric pits which foveolar cells line in order to provide a protective alkaline secretion against the corrosive gastric acid.

=== Microanatomy ===
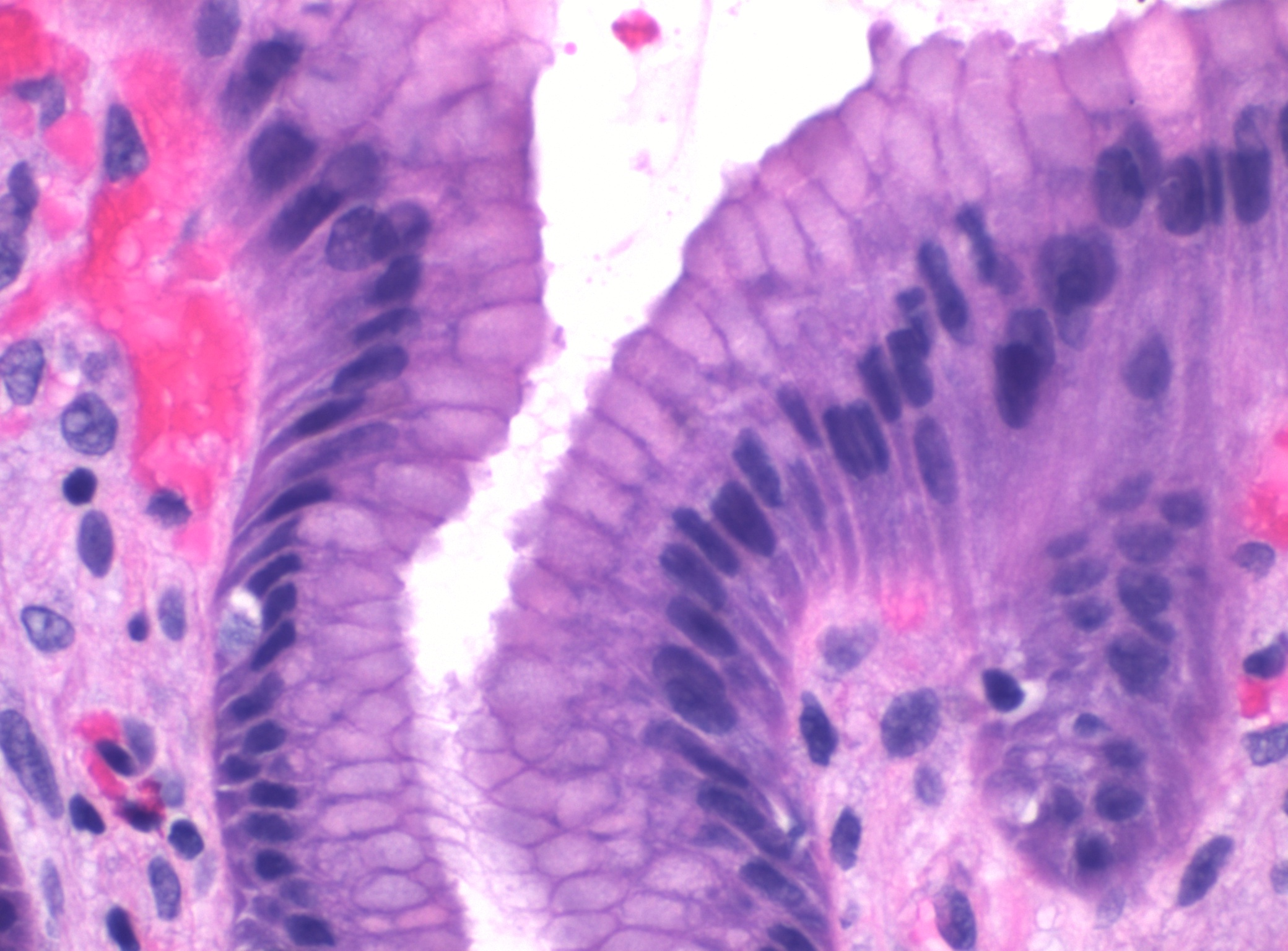
Foveolar cells in the antrum of stomach. A skewed cross-section of the columns gives a false impression of being stratified epithelium.

Foveolar cells line the surface of the stomach and the gastric pits. They constitute a simple columnar epithelium, as they form a single layer of cells and are taller than their width. Other mucus-secreting cells are the mucous neck cells in the necks of the gastric glands.

Surface mucous cells have large quantities of mucin granules in their apical (top) surface and project short microvilli into the lumen of the stomach. Mucins are large glycoproteins that give the mucus its gel-like properties. As mucins are lost during routine histology preparation, they stain pale, but if preserved correctly the cells stain strongly with special techniques like PAS or toluidine blue, the last representing the anionic nature of foveolar cell secretions. Below the mucin granules, surface mucous cells have a Golgi apparatus, the nucleus, and small amounts of rough endoplasmic reticulum. Mucous neck cells are located within gastric glands. These are shorter than their surface counterpart and contain lesser quantities of mucin granules in their apical surface.

== Function ==
Diagram showing bicarbonate secretion to the stomach lumen

The mucus produced by these cells is extremely important, as it prevents the stomach from digesting itself. Parietal cells produce potent hydrochloric acid, which damages cells. Gastric chief cells produce pepsinogen, which is activated by the acid to form pepsin. Pepsin is a protease that can digest and damage stomach cells. To prevent these disastrous effects, mucus and bicarbonate ions (HCO_{3}^{−}) are secreted by the foveolar cells.

The mucus allows the acid at pH above 4 to penetrate lining, but below pH 4 (i.e. when acid is more concentrated) the acid cannot penetrate the mucus. This is called viscous fingering. Thus the foveolar cells can pump out a lot of acid, but acid once in the lumen of the stomach is prevented from returning.

== See also ==
- List of human cell types derived from the germ layers
