= Fundic gland polyposis =

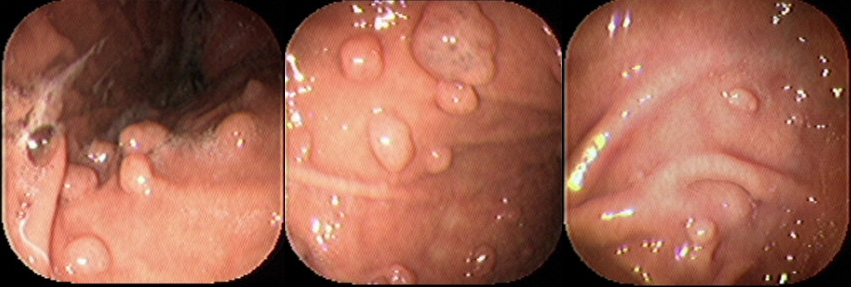
- Endoscopic image of fundic gland polyps taken on retroflexion of gastroscope.
- Specialty: Gastroenterology

Fundic gland polyposis is a medical syndrome where the fundus and the body of the stomach develop many fundic gland polyps. The condition has been described both in patients with familial adenomatous polyposis (FAP) and attenuated variants (AFAP), and in patients in whom it occurs sporadically.

== Presentation ==
Most patients with fundic gland polyps (FGPs) do not have any symptoms, and the diagnosis is made on gastroscopy done for other reasons. Retrospective analysis of patients with sporadic FGPs shows that a high percentage do have symptoms, but that this is more likely to be related to the underlying disease responsible for the polyposis. These symptoms include:

- epigastric pain
- nausea
- vomiting
- weight loss

The polyps on endoscopy are usually tiny, numerous and sessile, and usually scattered throughout the fundus of the stomach, where parietal cells are more numerous. They have the same colour as the gastric mucosa, and never have a stalk. When the polyps are biopsied, the pathology typically shows shortened gastric pits, and both superficial and deep cystic lesions in the fundic glands, lined by all three types of cells of acid-producing mucosa: mucous, parietal and chief cells. As sometimes parietal cell hyperplasia may develop deep dilations of gland, one should be really strict in the diagnosis of FGPs (i.e. the presence of deep and superficial dilations). Infrequently, the two lesions may coexist. Foci of dysplasia can sometimes be seen.

=== Disease associations ===
FGPs can be found in association with the following genetic conditions:

- familial adenomatous polyposis|
- attenuated familial adenomatous polyposis syndromes
- Zollinger-Ellison syndrome
- gastric adenocarcinoma associated with proximal polyposis of the stomach (GAPPS): this condition, described in three families is characterized by development of antral adenomas and FGPs, with early development of severe dysplasia and gastric cancer, in absence of overt intestinal polyposis. This condition has been recently characterized by a point mutation in exon 1B of APC gene.

Sporadic FGPs have been associated with:

- chronic use of proton pump inhibitors (proposed by some authors, denied by others)
- Helicobacter pylori infection: there is a reverse relationship between infection and fundic gland polyps, and infection by H pylori causes polyps regression.

== Pathophysiology ==
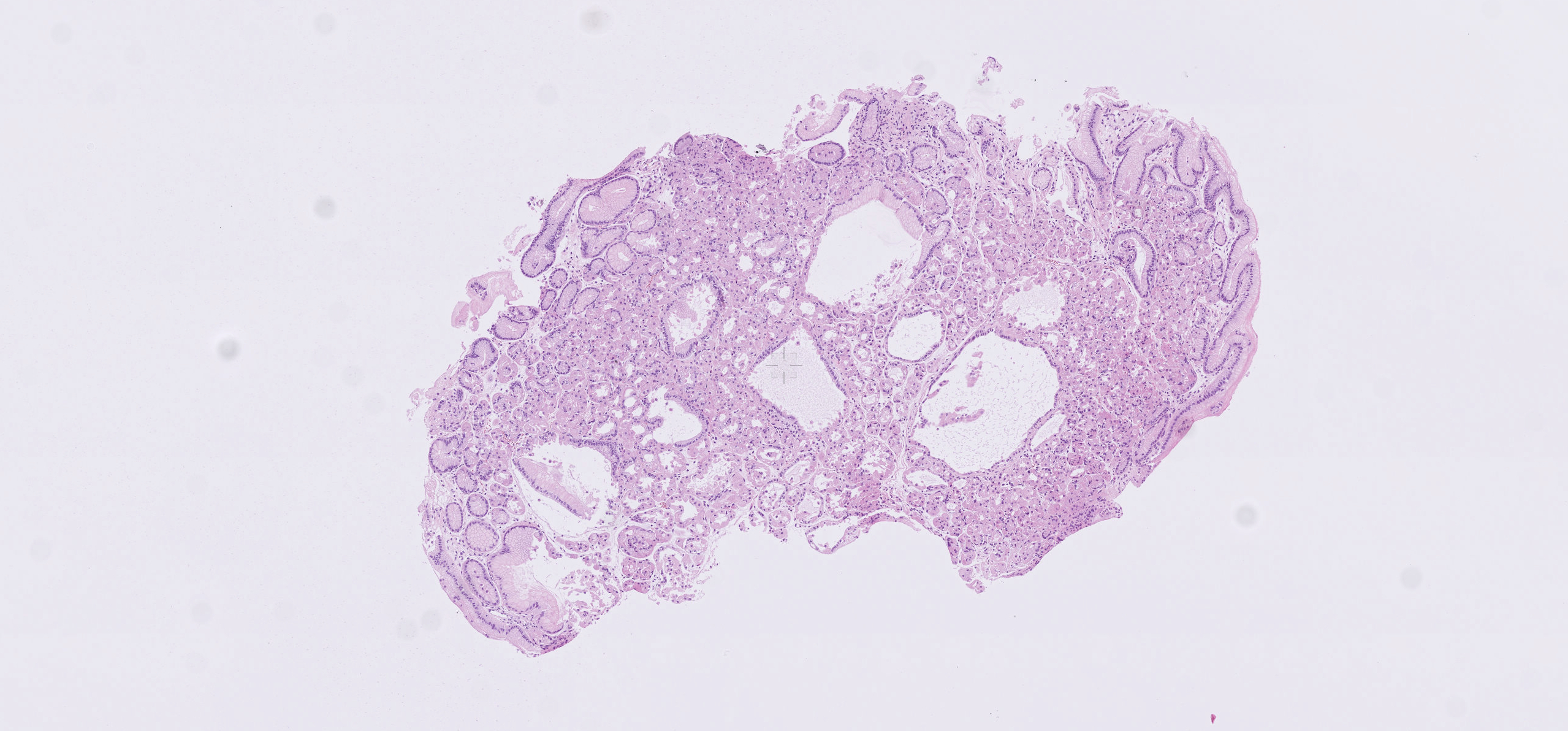
H&E stain of fundic gland polyp showing shortening of the gastric pits with cystic dilatation

The development of polyps depends on the underlying disorder. In sporadic cases of FGPs, more than 90% of patients have activating mutations in the β-catenin gene, so that they may be considered "neoplastic" polyps.

In familial adenomatous polyposis, the abnormality is a mutation in the APC gene, resulting in its inactivity. Attenuated FAP can occur from other mutations in the APC gene, and causes a phenotype wherein colonic polyps may be few in number.

Both the β-catenin gene and the APC gene are involved in the same cell growth signalling pathway, but the APC gene is known to have a significantly higher association with the development of colorectal tumors.

== Diagnosis ==
The most important consideration in evaluating patients with FGPs is distinguishing between sporadic form (patients without any other gastrointestinal condition, usually in middle age with female prevalence) and syndromic form. This is to ascertain the risk of development of gastric cancer and to ascertain the risk of concomitant colon cancer.

== Screening ==
There is a risk of development of cancer with fundic gland polyposis, but it varies based on the underlying cause of the polyposis. The risk is highest with congenital polyposis syndromes, and is lowest in acquired causes. As a result, it is recommended that patients with multiple fundic polyps have a colonoscopy to evaluate the colon. If there are polyps seen on colonoscopy, genetic testing and testing of family members is recommended. In the gastric adenocarcinoma associated with proximal polyposis of the stomach (GAPPS), there is a high risk of early development of proximal gastric adenocarcinoma.

It is still unclear which patients would benefit with surveillance gastroscopy, but most physicians recommend endoscopy every one to three years to survey polyps for dysplasia or cancer. In the event of high grade dysplasia, polypectomy, which is done through the endoscopy, or partial gastrectomy may be recommended. One study showed the benefit of NSAID therapy in regression of gastric polyps, but the efficacy of this strategy (given the side effects of NSAIDs) is still dubious.
