= Enteric ganglia =

Enteric ganglia may refer to:

- Submucous plexus
- Myenteric plexus
