= Gastritis =

Inflammation of the stomach lining

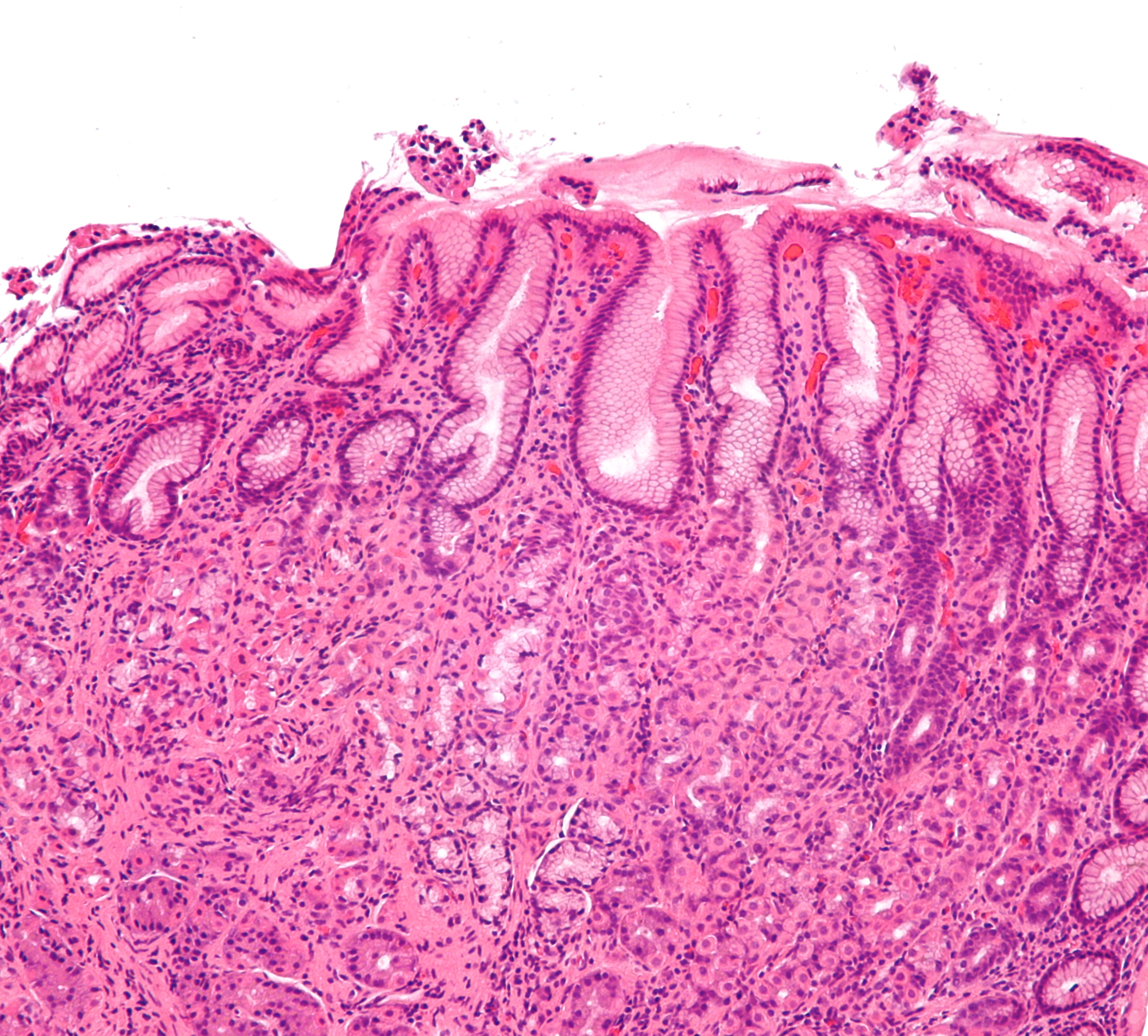
- Micrograph showing gastritis. H&E stain.
- Specialty: Gastroenterology
- Symptoms: Upper abdominal pain, nausea, vomiting, bloating, indigestion, loss of appetite, heartburn
- Complications: Bleeding, stomach ulcers, stomach tumors, pernicious anemia
- Duration: Short or long term
- Causes: Helicobacter pylori or other pathogens, NSAIDs, alcohol, cocaine, acute stress or physiological shock, autoimmune response
- Diagnostic method: Endoscopy with biopsy, upper gastrointestinal series, blood tests, stool tests
- Differential diagnosis: Myocardial infarction, inflammation of the pancreas, gallbladder problems, peptic ulcer disease
- Treatment: Antacids, H2 blockers, proton pump inhibitors, antibiotics, sucralfate, bismuth subsalicylate, antiemetics
- Frequency: 30%–50% of people
- Deaths: 50,000 (2015)

Gastritis is the inflammation of the lining of the stomach. It may occur as a short episode or have a long duration. There may be no symptoms, but the most common symptom is upper abdominal pain. Other symptoms include nausea and vomiting, bloating, indigestion, loss of appetite and heartburn. Complications may include stomach bleeding, stomach ulcers, and stomach tumors. Autoimmune atrophic gastritis may lead to issues including pernicious anemia.

Common causes include infection with Helicobacter pylori and use of nonsteroidal anti-inflammatory drugs (NSAIDs). Other causes include alcohol, smoking, cocaine, severe illness, autoimmune problems, radiation therapy and Crohn's disease. Endoscopy, a type of X-ray known as an upper gastrointestinal series, blood tests, and stool tests may help with diagnosis. Other conditions with similar symptoms include inflammation of the pancreas, gallbladder problems, and peptic ulcer disease.

Treatment depends on the cause of gastritis. Prevention involves avoidance of things which irritate the gut and which trigger symptoms, including alcohol, nonsteroidal anti-inflammatory drugs (NSAIDs), tobacco, and fatty, acidic, and spicy foods, and fasting too long or eating too much. It is also recommended to treat for any underlying H. pylori infection before starting NSAID treatment to prevent irritation and gastroduodenal ulcers. Treatment includes medications such as antacids, H2 blockers, and proton pump inhibitors. During an acute flare-up, drinking viscous lidocaine may help. If gastritis is caused by NSAID use (e.g., aspirin, ibuprofen, naproxen), usage may be ceased. If H. pylori is present, it may be treated with a combination of antibiotics such as amoxicillin and clarithromycin. For those with pernicious anemia, vitamin B12 supplements are recommended by injection.

Gastritis is believed to be present in 30% to 50% of people worldwide, but most cases are asymptomatic. In 2013, there were approximately 90 million new cases of the condition. The risk of developing gastritis increases as one ages. Gastritis, along with a similar condition in the first part of the intestines called duodenitis, resulted in 50,000 deaths in 2015. H. pylori was first discovered in 1981 by Barry Marshall and Robin Warren.

== Signs and symptoms ==
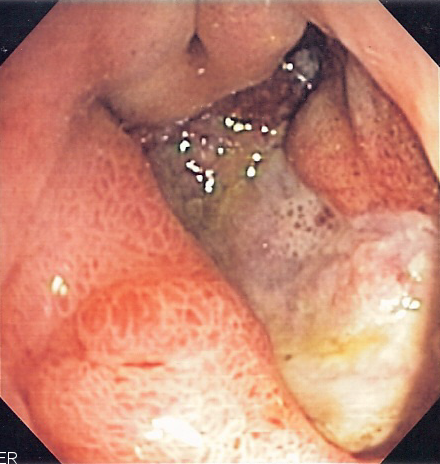
A peptic ulcer, which may accompany gastritis, seen via endoscopy

Many people with gastritis experience no symptoms at all. However, upper central abdominal pain is the most common symptom; the pain may be dull, vague, burning, aching, gnawing, sore, or sharp. Pain is usually located in the upper central portion of the abdomen, but it may occur anywhere from the upper left portion of the abdomen around to the back.

Other signs and symptoms include:

- nausea and vomiting (may be clear, green or yellow, blood-streaked or completely bloody depending on the severity of the stomach inflammation)
- belching
- bloating
- early satiety
- loss of appetite
- indigestion, that may be sometimes accompanied by depression, anxiety, and even irritability

== Causes ==
=== Infection ===
Helicobacter pylori infection is the most common cause of gastritis; when contracted this way, it may be termed H. pylori gastritis. H. pylori is a kind of bacteria which colonizes the gut of more than half of the world's population. While the bacteria are present in over half of the world's population, infection does not necessarily cause symptoms, and thus most cases are asymptomatic. It has been suggested that H. pylori plays an important role in the natural stomach ecology.

While H. pylori is the most common infectious cause of gastritis, there are other pathogens that can cause the disease. Uncommon causes include those of the genera Cytomegalovirus and Candida. Rare bacterial causes include Helicobacter heilmannii, Escherichia coli, and those of the genera Actinomyces, Clostridium, Mycobacterium, Proteus, Spirochaete, Streptococcus, and Staphylococcus. Rare fungal causes include those of the genus Histoplasma and those which can cause Phycomycosis. Rare parasitic causes include Ascaris lumbricoides and those of the parasitic genera Anisakis, Strongyloides, and Cryptosporidium.

=== Drugs ===
Gastritis can result from the use of some drugs, the most common being the use of nonsteroidal anti-inflammatory drugs (NSAIDs) such as aspirin, ibuprofen, and naproxen. Other drugs include cocaine, iron, colchicine when administered at toxic levels, kayexalate (a kind of polystyrene sulfonate), ticlopidine, and those associated with chemotherapy and immunotherapy for cancer. Drugs used for COVID-19 treatment have also been found to cause gastritis; tocilizumab and sarilumab are associated with chronic gastritis, while lopinavir/ritonavir is associated with the acute form.

=== Stress, injury, and illness ===
Gastritis (usually acute gastritis) may develop after acute stress, shock, and direct trauma. Specific conditions include uremia, ischemia (specifically in the stomach), sepsis, and food poisoning. Gastritis may also develop after major surgery or traumatic injury (Cushing ulcer), burns (Curling ulcer), or severe infections. Gastritis may also occur in those who have had weight loss surgery, resulting in the banding or reconstruction of the digestive tract.

Gastritis is also associated with bile reflux, in which bile and/or pancreatic enzymes flow up into the stomach; when bile travels further upwards into the esophagus, it is called gastric reflux. Excessive refluxed bile in the stomach causes irritation and inflammation to the stomach lining, leading to the development of gastric ulcers and/or gastritis; when contracted this way, it may be termed bile reflux gastritis.

=== Autoimmune ===
Autoimmune atrophic gastritis is a chronic form of gastritis caused by the destruction of gastric parietal cells due to an autoimmune response. These cells in the stomach produce intrinsic factor necessary for the absorption of vitamin B12, and their destruction can result in vitamin B12 deficiency. Later stages of autoimmune atrophic gastritis may develop into pernicious anemia or megaloblastic anemia.

=== Diet ===
Evidence does not support a role for specific foods, including spicy foods and coffee, in the development of peptic ulcers. People are, however, usually advised to avoid foods that trigger symptoms. There is little specific advice on diet published by authoritative sources. The National Health Service of the United Kingdom advises avoiding spicy, acidic or fried foods which may irritate the stomach.

It is generally advised to avoid alcohol consumption for the prevention and mitigation of gastrointestinal injury. Some sources describe alcohol as a potential cause of gastritis, while others describe it instead as a potential contributor to the erosion of the stomach's mucosal lining when ingested in large doses.

== Pathophysiology ==
=== Acute ===
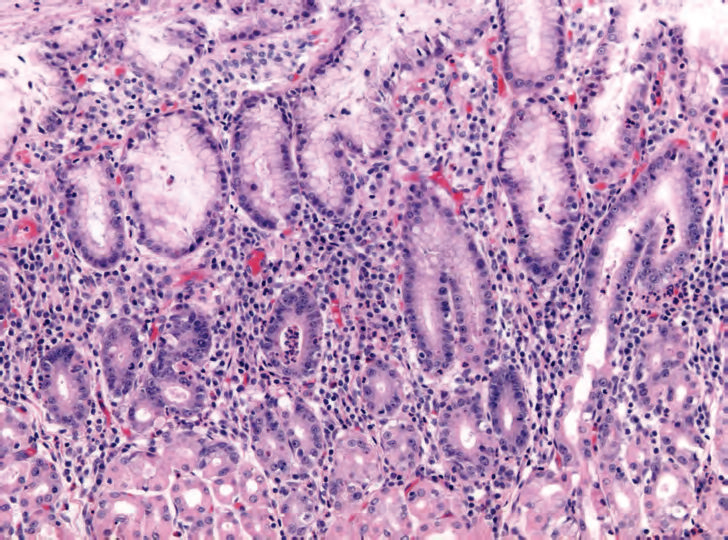
Early acute superficial gastritis. Marked neutrophilic infiltrates appear in the mucous neck region and lamina with a pit microabscess. This case was caused by Helicobacter pylori.

Acute erosive gastritis typically involves discrete foci of surface necrosis due to damage to mucosal defenses. NSAIDs inhibit cyclooxygenase-1, or COX-1, an enzyme responsible for the biosynthesis of eicosanoids in the stomach, increasing the likelihood of peptic ulcers forming. NSAIDs also inhibit prostaglandin synthesis, a hormone with a protective effect on the stomach's mucosal lining. While short-term NSAID use causes no problems, long-term use can lead to gastritis or other complications.

=== Metaplasia ===
Metaplasia is the transformation of differentiated cells from one type into another type. Mucous gland metaplasia can occur after severe damage to the gastric glands causes them to waste away (atrophic gastritis) and be progressively replaced by mucous glands. Gastric ulcers may develop; it is unclear if they are the cause or the consequence.

Intestinal metaplasia typically begins in response to chronic mucosal injury in the antrum and may extend to the body. Gastric mucosa cells change to resemble intestinal mucosa and may even assume absorptive characteristics. Intestinal metaplasia is classified histologically as complete or incomplete. In the complete type, gastric mucosa is completely transformed into small-bowel mucosa, both histologically and functionally, with the ability to absorb nutrients and secrete peptides. In the incomplete type, the epithelium assumes a histologic appearance closer to that of the large intestine and frequently exhibits dysplasia.

== Diagnosis ==
Gastritis should be investigated when a patient reports abdominal discomfort, pain, and/or nausea. Diagnosis relies primarily on the findings of an upper endoscopy with biopsy, but also involves taking a comprehensive patient history. While history and other tests can help provide insights, histopathological examination of gastric biopsies is the gold standard, and allows one to identify the distribution, severity, and etiology of the disease.

Other tests which may be ordered to diagnose or rule out gastritis include:

- H. pylori testing by urea breath test, stool antigen test, endoscopic biopsy, or specific antibody test
- Blood testing for:
  - Vitamin B12 level
  - Blood cell count (particularly hematocrit)
  - Liver, kidney, gallbladder, or pancreas functions
- Urinalysis, to assess for dehydration, ketosis, and bilirubin
- Stool sample, to assess for blood
- Radiography, specifically an upper gastrointestinal series

=== Classification ===
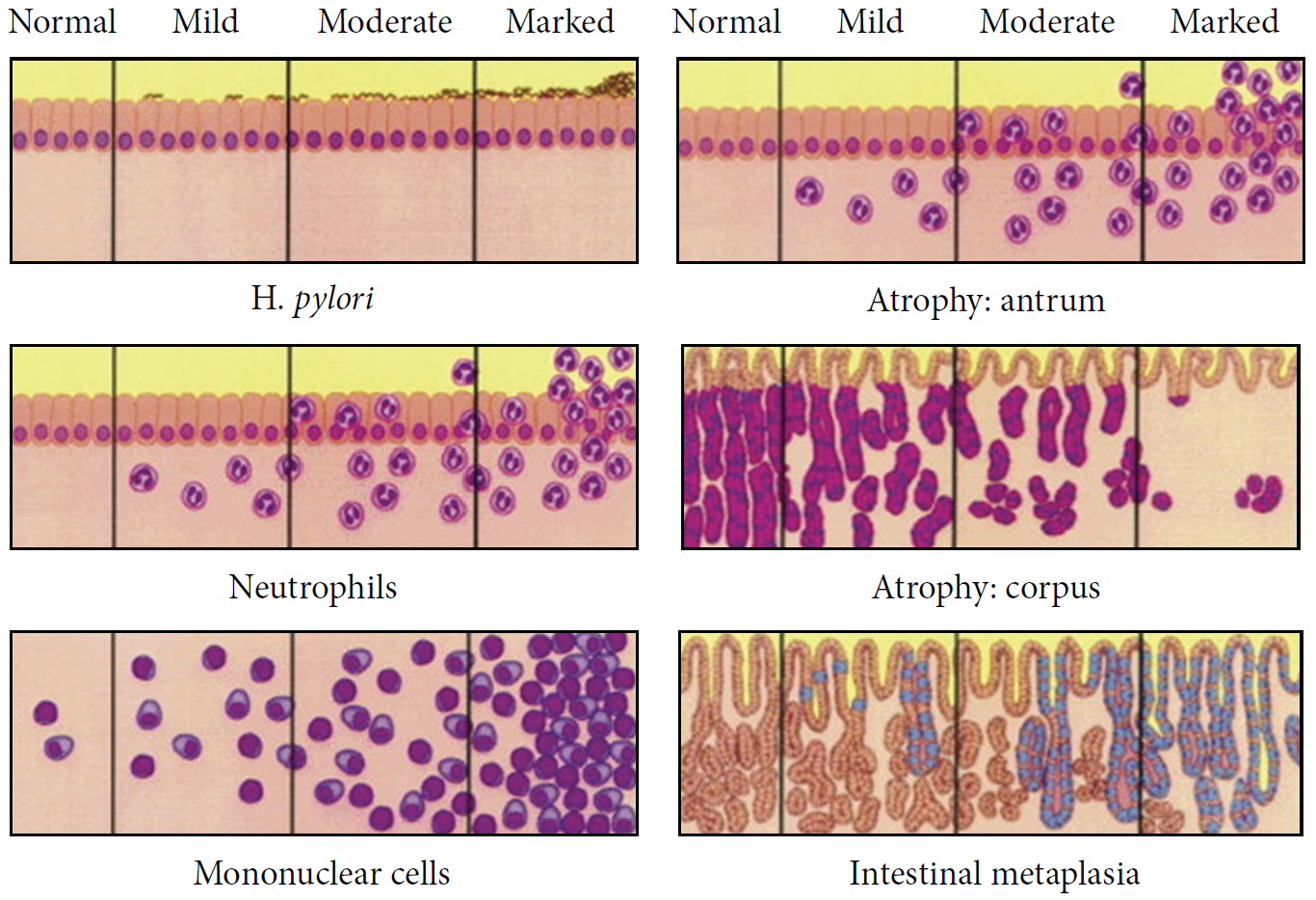
Updated Sydney System (USS) for classification of gastritis based on morphological features

Multiple classification systems may be used to categorise gastritis cases. The Updated Sydney System (USS) of 1994 is commonly used for classification, based primarily on the morphological features of the disease seen in endoscopic biopsies. The Kyoto system (from the 2015 Kyoto Consensus Conference) classifies gastritis based primarily on the cause and duration of symptoms, resulting in the 3 types: acute, chronic, and special. Gastritis may also be classified based on the kind of mucosal injury, resulting in the 2 types: erosive and non-erosive.

The Operative Link for Gastritis Assessment (OLGA) staging system may also be used to classify cases of gastritis. The OLGA system was devised in an attempt to evaluate complication risk, in particular the development of gastritis into intestinal metaplasia or gastric cancer. The degree of atrophy and metaplasia at two main sites is scored on a four-tiered scale.

		Corpus			
		No atrophy (score 0)	Mild atrophy (score 1)	Moderate atrophy (score 2)	Severe atrophy (score 3)
Antrum (including incisura angularis)
Antrum (including incisura angularis)	No atrophy (score 0)	Stage 0	Stage I	Stage II	Stage II
Antrum (including incisura angularis)	Mild atrophy (score 1)	Stage I	Stage I	Stage II	Stage III
Antrum (including incisura angularis)	Moderate atrophy (score 2)	Stage II	Stage II	Stage III	Stage IV
Antrum (including incisura angularis)	Severe atrophy (score 3)	Stage III	Stage III	Stage IV	Stage IV

== Treatment ==
Antacids are a common treatment for mild to medium gastritis. When antacids do not provide enough relief, medications such as H_{2} blockers and proton-pump inhibitors that help reduce the amount of acid are often prescribed.

Cytoprotective agents are designed to help protect the tissues that line the stomach and small intestine. They include the medications sucralfate and misoprostol. If NSAIDs are being taken regularly, one of these medications to protect the stomach may also be taken. Another cytoprotective agent is bismuth subsalicylate.

Several regimens are used to treat H. pylori infection. Most use a combination of two antibiotics and a proton pump inhibitor. Sometimes bismuth is added to the regimen.

== History ==
Gastric cancer was first described in 1000 A.D. by the Persian physician Avicenna. In 1728, German physician Georg Ernst Stahl coined the term "gastritis". Italian anatomical pathologist Giovanni Battista Morgagni further described the characteristics of gastric inflammation, including the characteristics of erosive or ulcerative gastritis and erosive gastritis. Between 1808 and 1831, French physician François-Joseph-Victor Broussais gathered information from autopsies of dead French soldiers. He described chronic gastritis as "gastritide" and erroneously believed that gastritis was the cause of ascites, typhoid fever, and meningitis. In 1854, Charles Handfield Jones and Wilson Fox described the microscopic changes of the stomach's inner lining in gastritis. In 1855, Baron Carl von Rokitansky first described hypertrophic gastritis. In 1859, British physician William Brinton first described acute, subacute, and chronic gastritis. In 1870, Samuel Fenwick noted that pernicious anemia causes glandular atrophy in gastritis. German surgeon Georg Ernst Konjetzny noticed that both gastric ulcers and gastric cancer are the result of gastric inflammation. Shields Warren and Willam A. Meissner described the intestinal metaplasia of the stomach as a feature of chronic gastritis.

== See also ==
- Gastroenteritis
- Esophagitis
- Stress ulcer
