= Gastric glands =

Glands in lining of the human stomach

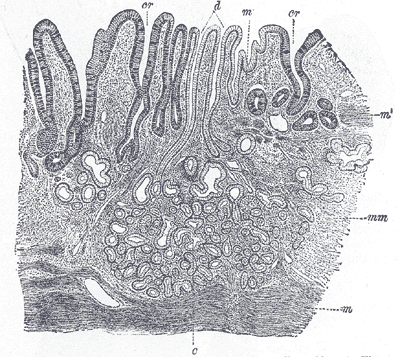
- Gastric glands shown at c and their ducts at d

Details

Identifiers
- Latin: glandulae gastricae

Gastric glands are glands in the lining of the stomach that play an essential role in the process of digestion. Their secretions make up the digestive gastric juice. The gastric glands open into gastric pits in the mucosa. The gastric mucosa is covered in surface mucous cells that produce the mucus necessary to protect the stomach's epithelial lining from gastric acid secreted by parietal cells in the glands, and from pepsin, a secreted digestive enzyme. Surface mucous cells follow the indentations and partly line the gastric pits. Other mucus secreting cells are found in the necks of the glands. These are mucous neck cells that produce a different kind of mucus.

There are two types of gastric gland, the exocrine fundic or oxyntic gland, and the endocrine pyloric gland. The major type of gastric gland is the fundic gland that is present in the fundus and the body of the stomach making up about 80 per cent of the stomach area. These glands are often referred to simply as the gastric glands. The fundic gland contains the parietal cells that produce hydrochloric acid and intrinsic factor, and chief cells that produce pepsinogen and gastric lipase.

The pyloric gland is found in the pyloric region, the remaining 20 per cent of the stomach. The pyloric glands are mainly in the pyloric antrum. The pyloric gland secretes gastrin from its G cells. Pyloric glands are similar in structure to the fundic glands but have hardly any parietal cells.

== Types of gland ==
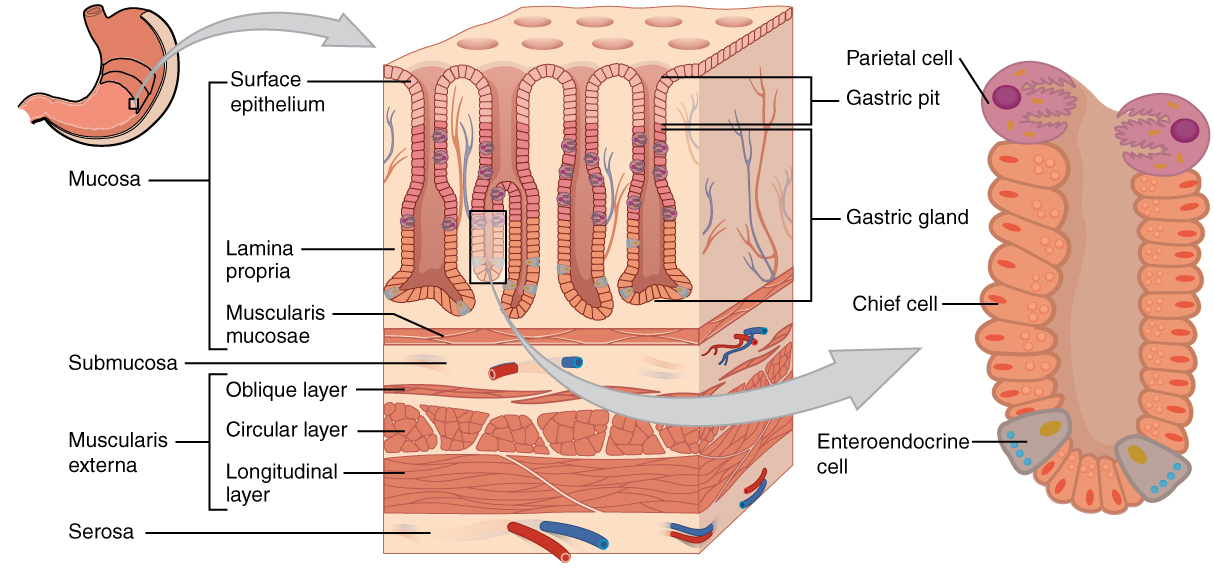
Illustration of stomach wall showing gastric mucosa and the gastric glands

The gastric glands are glands in the lining of the stomach that play an essential role in the process of digestion. All of the glands have mucus-secreting foveolar cells (also known as surface mucous cells) that line the stomach and partly line the gastric pits, and mucus-secreting mucous neck cells in the necks of the gastric glands. Mucus lines the entire stomach as gastric mucosa protecting the stomach lining from the effects of gastric acid produced by the parietal cells and released from the fundic glands.

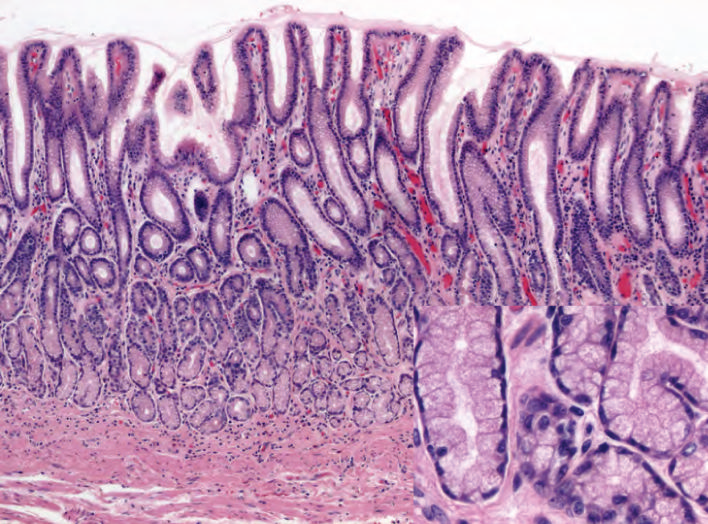
Histology of mucosa showing gastric glands. H&E stain

Gastric glands are mostly exocrine glands and are all located beneath the gastric pits within the gastric mucosa. The gastric mucosa is pitted with innumerable gastric pits which each house 3-5 gastric glands. The cells of the exocrine glands (fundic glands) are mucous neck cells, chief cells, and parietal cells. Mucous neck cells produce mucus, parietal cells secrete hydrochloric acid and intrinsic factor, chief cells secrete pepsinogen and gastric lipase.

The other type of gastric gland is the pyloric gland which is an endocrine gland that secretes the hormone gastrin produced by its G cells.

=== Gastric juice ===
The secretions of the different exocrine gastric gland cells produce a watery, acidic fluid into the stomach lumen called gastric juice. Gastric juice contains water, hydrochloric acid, intrinsic factor, pepsin, and salts. Adults produce around two to three litres of gastric juice per day. The composition of the fluid varies according to the time of eating, and the rates of activity of the various cells. The cells are more active after eating. The composition of the gastric juice electrolytes is related to its rate of secretion: when secretion increases, the concentration of sodium decreases, and the concentration of hydrogen increases. There is always a higher level of potassium ions in the fluid than in the plasma.

== Location ==
The glands are named for the region of the stomach that they occupy.

The cardiac glands are found in the cardia of the stomach which is the part nearest to the heart, enclosing the opening where the esophagus joins to the stomach. Cardiac glands primarily secrete mucus. They are fewer in number than the other gastric glands and are more shallowly positioned in the mucosa. There are two kinds - either simple tubular with short ducts or compound racemose resembling the duodenal Brunner's glands.

The fundic glands (or oxyntic glands), are found in the fundus and body of the stomach. They are simple almost straight tubes, two or more of which open into a single duct. Oxyntic means acid-secreting and they secrete hydrochloric acid (HCl) and intrinsic factor.

The pyloric glands are located in the antrum of the pylorus. They secrete gastrin produced by their G cells.

== Types of cell ==
Diagram depicting the major determinants of gastric acid secretion

There are millions of gastric pits (also known as foveolae) in the gastric mucosa and their necessary narrowness determines the tubular form of the gastric gland. More than one tube allows for the accommodation of more than one cell type. The form of each gastric gland is similar; they are all described as having a neck region that is closest to the pit entrance, and basal regions on the lower parts of the tubes. The epithelium from the gastric mucosa travels into the pit and at the neck the epithelial cells change to short columnar granular cells. These cells almost fill the tube and the remaining lumen is continued as a very fine channel.

Cells found in the gastric glands include:

- Foveolar cells (surface mucous cells) are mucus-producing cells which cover the inside of the stomach, protecting it from the corrosive nature of gastric acid. These cells line the gastric mucosa and follows into the gastric pits.
- Mucous neck cells are located within gastric glands, interspersed between parietal cells. These are shorter than their surface counterpart and contain lesser quantities of mucin granules in their apical surface.

Gastric chief cell

Parietal cell

- Chief cells (zymogen cells/peptic cells) – They are found in the basal regions of the gland and release proenzymes or zymogens – pepsinogen (precursor to pepsin), and prorennin (precursor to rennin or chymosin). Prorennin is secreted in young mammals (childhood stage). It is not secreted in adult mammals. Chief cells also produce small amounts of gastric lipase. Gastric lipase contributes little to digestion of fat.
- Parietal cells ("parietal" means "relating to a wall"), also known as oxyntic cells are most numerous on the side walls of the gastric glands. The parietal cells secrete hydrochloric acid (gastric acid). This needs to be readily available for the stomach in a plentiful supply, and so from their positions in the walls, their secretory networks of fine channels called canaliculi can project and ingress into all the regions of the gastric-pit lumen. Another important secretion of the parietal cells is intrinsic factor. Intrinsic factor is a glycoprotein essential for the absorption of vitamin B12. The parietal cells also produce and release bicarbonate ions in response to histamine release from the nearby ECLs, and so serve a crucial role in the pH buffering system.
- Enteroendocrine cells – They are usually present in the basal parts of the gastric glands, which is differentiated into three cell types – enterochromaffin like cells (ECL cells), G cells, and D cells.
  - Enterochromaffin-like cells (ECL cells) – They release serotonin and histamine. These cells store and release histamine when the pH of the stomach becomes too high. The release of histamine is stimulated by the secretion of gastrin from the G cells. Histamine promotes the production and release of HCL from the parietal cells to the blood and protons to the stomach lumen. When the stomach pH decreases (becomes more acidic), the ECLs stop releasing histamine.
  - G cells – They secrete gastrin hormone. Gastrin stimulates the gastric glands to release gastric acid. These cells are mostly found in pyloric glands in the pyloric antrum; some are found in the duodenum and other tissues. The gastric pits of these glands are much deeper than the others and here the gastrin is secreted into the bloodstream not the lumen.
  - D cells – D cells secrete somatostatin. Somatostatin suppresses the release of hormones from the digestive tract.

== Clinical significance ==
Fundic gland polyposis is a medical syndrome where the fundus and the body of the stomach develop many fundic gland polyps.

Pernicious anemia is caused when damaged parietal cells fail to produce the intrinsic factor necessary for the absorption of vitamin B12. This is the most common cause of vitamin B12 deficiency.

== Additional images ==
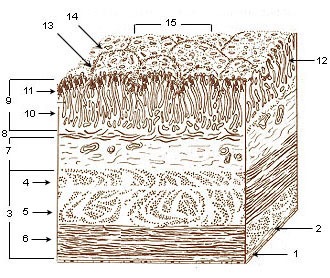
Layers of stomach wall

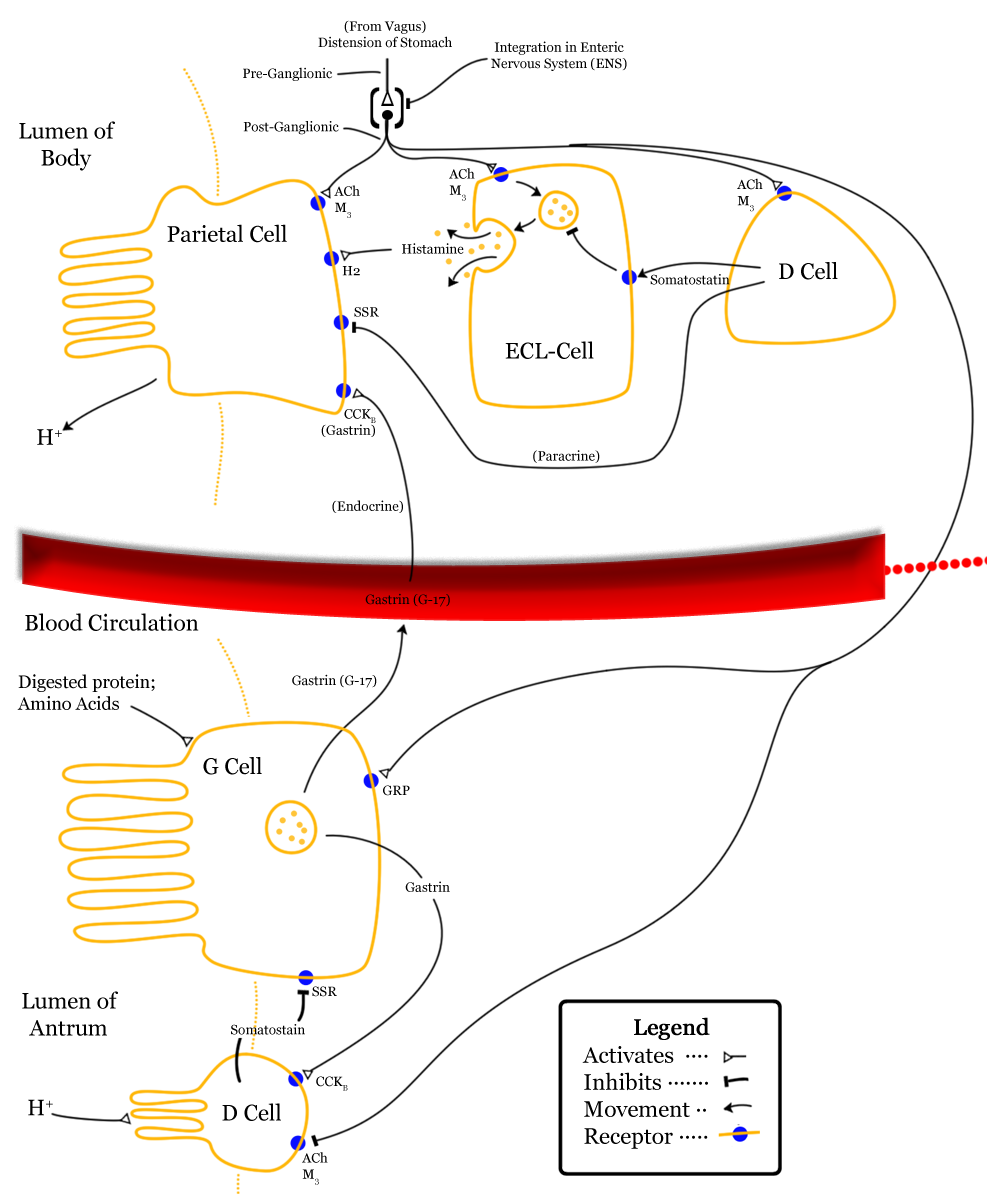
Gastric acid regulation

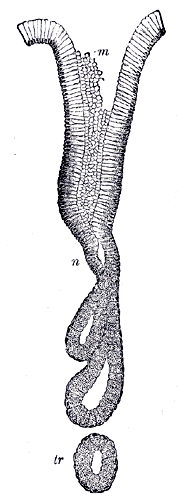
Human pyloric glands (at pylorus)

== See also ==
List of distinct cell types in the adult human body
