= Gastric lipase =

Enzyme found in humans

LIPF

Identifiers
- Aliases: LIPF, GL, HGL, HLAL, lipase F, gastric type, Gastric Lipase
- External IDs: OMIM: 601980; MGI: 1914967; GeneCards: LIPF
Available structures
PDB	Ortholog search: PDBe RCSB
PDB	List of PDB id codes 1HLG
Enzyme activity
EC #	BRENDA	ExPASy	KEGG	MetaCyc
3.1.1.3	↗	↗	↗	↗

Gene location (Human)
Chr.	Chromosome 10 (human)
Band	10q23.31	Start	88,664,441 bp
Band	10q23.31	End	88,678,814 bp

Gene location (Mouse)
Chr.	Chromosome 19 (mouse)
Band	19|19 C1	Start	33,938,587 bp
Band	19|19 C1	End	33,954,210 bp
RNA expression pattern
Bgee	Human / Mouse (ortholog); Top expressed in: cardia; pylorus; body of stomach; right uterine tube; gonad; fundus; gastric mucosa; sperm; testicle; right coronary artery / Top expressed in: trachea; tongue; spermatid; sexually immature organism; body wall; cochlea; seminiferous tubule; subcutaneous adipose tissue; spermatocyte; lung; More reference expression data
BioGPS	n/a
Gene ontology
Molecular function	triglyceride lipase activity; malate dehydrogenase activity; hydrolase activity; hydrolase activity, acting on ester bonds; lipid binding; lipase activity
Cellular component	extracellular region; mitochondrion; cellular component; intracellular membrane-bounded organelle
Biological process	lipid catabolic process; triglyceride metabolic process; malate metabolic process; lipid metabolism; cellular lipid metabolic process
Sources:Amigo / QuickGO
Orthologs
Databases	NCBI: entry; OMA: entry
Species	Human	Mouse
Entrez	8513	67717
Ensembl	ENSG00000182333	ENSMUSG00000024768
UniProt	P07098	Q9CPP7
RefSeq (mRNA)	NM_001198828; NM_001198829; NM_001198830; NM_004190	NM_026334
RefSeq (protein)	NP_001185757; NP_001185758; NP_001185759; NP_004181	NP_080610
Location (UCSC)	Chr 10: 88.66 – 88.68 Mb	Chr 19: 33.94 – 33.95 Mb
PubMed search
- Wikidata
View/Edit Human	View/Edit Mouse

Gastric lipase
- Crystal structure of human gastric lipase (PDB 1hlg).

Identifiers
- Symbol: LIPF
- NCBI gene: 8513
- HGNC: 6622
- OMIM: 601980
- RefSeq: NM_004190
- UniProt: P07098

Other data
- EC number: 3.1.1.3
- Locus: Chr. 10 q23
Search for
- Structures: Swiss-model
- Domains: InterPro

Gastric lipase, also known as LIPF, is an enzymatic protein that, in humans, is encoded by the LIPF gene.

== Function ==
Gastric lipase is an acidic lipase secreted by the gastric chief cells in the fundic mucosa in the stomach. It has a pH optimum of 3–6. Gastric lipase, together with lingual lipase, are acidic lipases. These lipases, unlike alkaline lipases (such as pancreatic lipase), do not require bile acid or colipase for optimal enzymatic activity. Acidic lipases make up 30% of lipid hydrolysis occurring during digestion in the human adult, with gastric lipase contributing the most of the two acidic lipases. In neonates, acidic lipases are much more important, providing up to 50% of total lipolytic activity.

Gastric lipase hydrolyzes the ester bonds of triglycerides in the stomach. Fatty acids and diacylglycerols are produced from this reaction. The long chain free fatty acids have the ability to prevent gastric lipase from hydrolyzing more triglycerides. In this case, gastric acid will be responsible for less than 30% of lipid hydrolysis. These enzymes are found in the cytoplasm and cell membranes of gastric cells. Gastric lipase is not the primary lipase needed for the majority of triglyceride hydrolysis. Outside of the stomach, gastric lipase can hydrolyze triacylglycerol in the duodenum with the help of other lipases and bile secretion. It is an essential enzyme for hydrolyzing milk fat globule membranes. For a newborn with an underdeveloped pancreas, LIPF plays a more important role in lipid digestion compared to an adult with a fully functioning pancreas. There is typically an increase in production of LIPF when the pancreas is unable to operate at its optimal potential. Low levels of LIPF are typically seen in the tumors of gastric cancer patients.

== Clinical significance ==
Gastric lipase can partially compensate for the decrease in production of pancreatic lipase associated with pancreatic dysfunction, giving some means for the body to digest lipids. A limitation of acidic lipases is that they remove only one fatty acid from each triacylglycerol. The free fatty acid can readily cross the epithelial membrane lining the gastrointestinal tract, but the diacylglycerol cannot be transported across. This leaves the acidic lipases less efficient than alkaline lipases.

== Structure ==
Gastric lipase is a polypeptide of 371 residues in length. The structure of gastric lipase was determined using X-ray diffraction with a resolution of 3.00 Å, and is composed of 41% helices and 14% beta sheets. Gastric lipase belongs to the α/β hydrolase fold family. It possesses a classical catalytic triad (Ser-153, His-353, Asp-324) and an oxyanion hole (backbone NH groups of Gln-154 and Leu-67) analogous to serine proteases.
