= Fundic gland polyp =

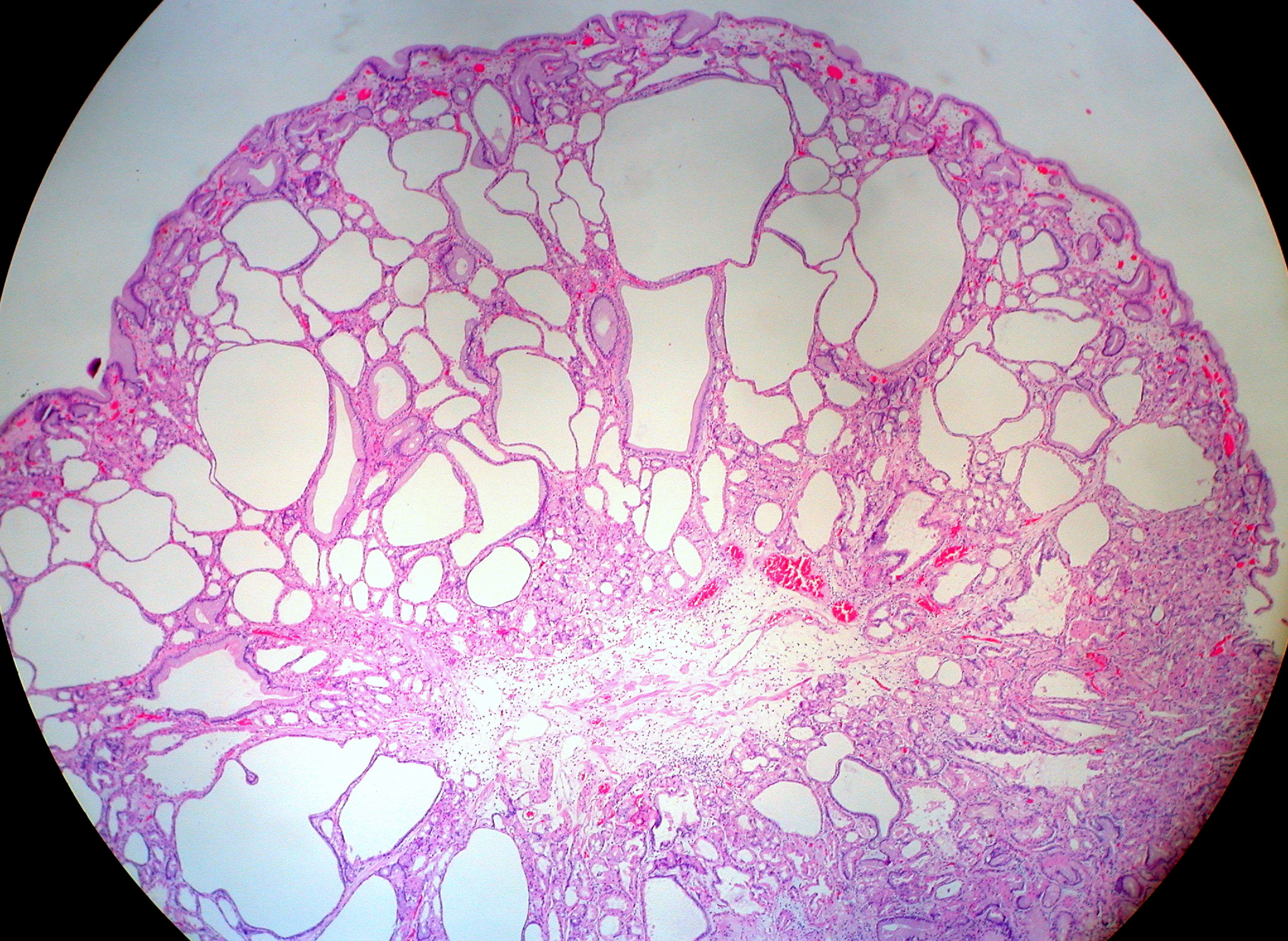
- On histopathology, a fundic gland polyp displays cystically dilated glands.
- Specialty: Gastroenterology
- Frequency: 0.8 - 1.9% of patients undergoing EGD

A fundic gland polyp is a type of polyp, found in the fundus of the stomach. Fundic gland polyps are found in 0.8 to 1.9% of patients who undergo esophagogastroduodenoscopy, and are more common in middle-aged women.

The risk of malignancy is very low or none, when sporadic.

Fundic gland polyposis is a medical syndrome with multiple fundic gland polyps. The condition has been described both in patients with familial adenomatous polyposis (FAP) and attenuated variants (AFAP), and in patients in whom it occurs sporadically.

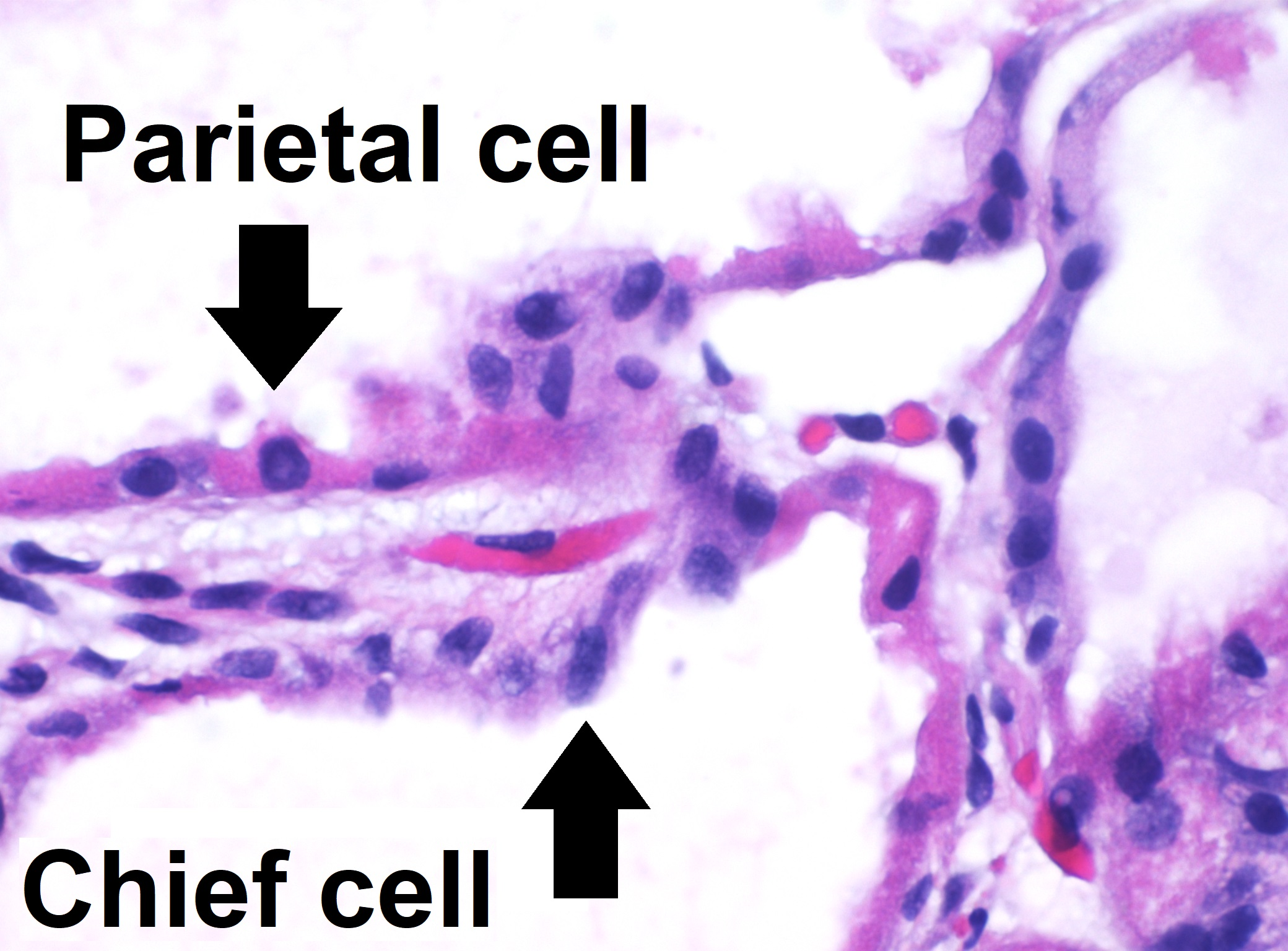
The glands are lined by chief cells and parietal cells, and possibly also mucinous foveolar cells.

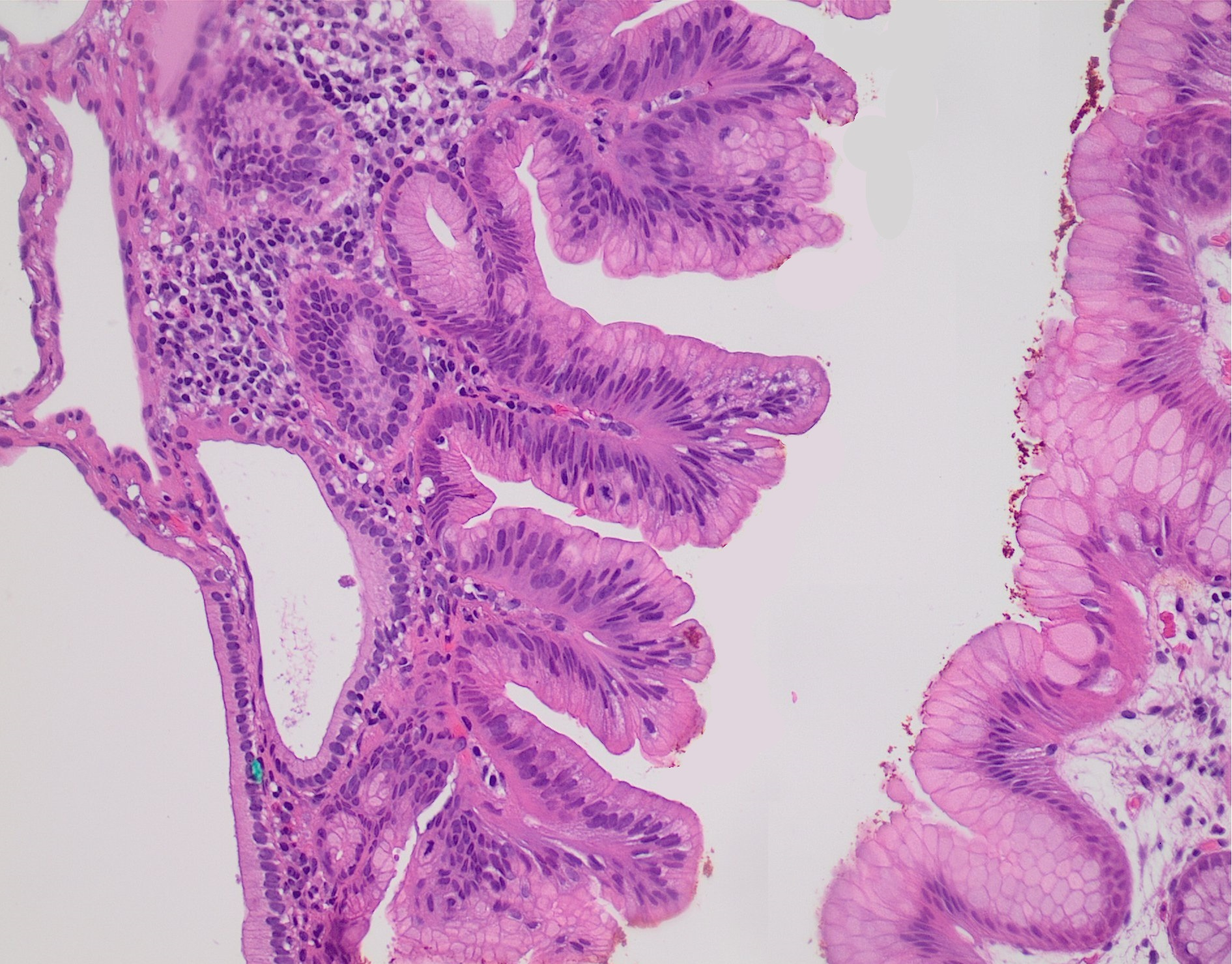
Fundic gland polyp with dysplasia (center), compared to normal mucosa (at right).
