= Submucosal plexus =

Part of the enteric nervous system

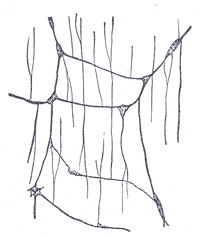
- The plexus of the submucosa from the rabbit. X 50.

Details

Identifiers
- Latin: plexus nervosus submucosus, plexus submucosus, plexus Meissneri
- MeSH: D013368
- TA98: A14.3.03.042
- TA2: 6728
- FMA: 63252

The submucosal plexus (Meissner's plexus, plexus of the submucosa, plexus submucosus) lies in the submucosa of the intestinal wall. The nerves of this plexus are derived from the myenteric plexus which itself is derived from the plexuses of parasympathetic nerves around the superior mesenteric artery. Branches from the myenteric plexus perforate the circular muscle fibers to form the submucosal plexus. Ganglia from the plexus extend into the muscularis mucosae and also extend into the mucous membrane.

They contain Dogiel cells. The nerve bundles of the submucosal plexus are finer than those of the myenteric plexus. Its function is to innervate cells in the epithelial layer and the smooth muscle of the muscularis mucosae.

14% of submucosal plexus neurons are sensory neurons – Dogiel type II, also known as enteric primary afferent neurons or intrinsic primary afferent neurons.

== History ==
Meissners' plexus was described by German professor Georg Meissner.
