= Lamina propria =

Thin connective tissue layer of mucous membranes

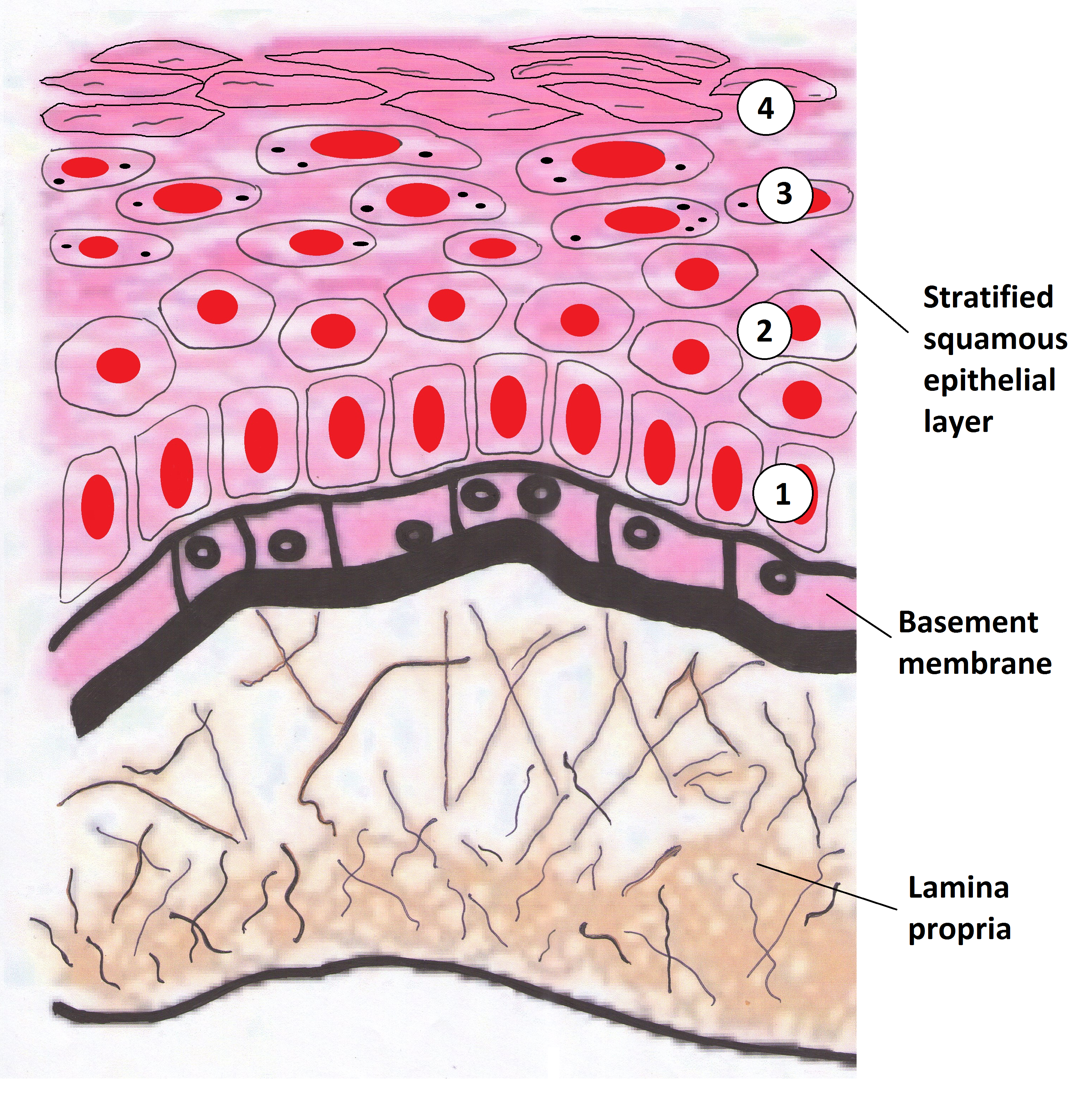
- The lamina propria, a thin layer of connective tissue, is part of the mucosa. Here is an example of the mucosa of the mouth.

Details
- Part of: Mucosa

Identifiers
- Latin: lamina propria mucosæ
- FMA: 62517

The lamina propria is a thin layer of connective tissue that forms part of the moist linings known as mucous membranes or mucosae, which line various tubes in the body, such as the respiratory tract, the gastrointestinal tract, and the urogenital tract.

The lamina propria is a thin layer of loose (areolar) connective tissue, which lies beneath the epithelium, and together with the epithelium and basement membrane constitutes the mucosa. As its Latin name indicates, it is a characteristic component of the mucosa, or the mucosa's "own special layer." Thus, the term mucosa or mucous membrane refers to the combination of the epithelium and the lamina propria.

The connective tissue of the lamina propria is loose and rich in cells. The cells of the lamina propria are variable and can include fibroblasts, lymphocytes, plasma cells, macrophages, eosinophilic leukocytes, and mast cells. It provides support and nutrition to the epithelium, as well as the means to bind to the underlying tissue. Irregularities in the connective tissue surface, such as papillae found in the tongue, increase the area of contact of the lamina propria and the epithelium.

== Structure ==
The lamina propria is a loose connective tissue, hence it is not as fibrous as the underlying connective tissue of the submucosa. The connective tissue and architecture of the lamina propria is very compressible and elastic, this can be seen in organs that require expansion such as the bladder. The collagen in the lamina propria of elastic organs has been shown to play a major role in mechanical function. In the bladder the collagen composition of its lamina propria allows for structure, tensile strength, and compliance, through complex coiling. It has been suggested that myofibroblasts also reside in the lamina propria of several organs. These cells have characteristics of both smooth muscle and fibroblasts.

The lamina propria may also be rich in vascular networks, lymphatic vessels, elastic fibers, and smooth muscle fascicles from the muscularis mucosae. Afferent and efferent nerve endings can be found in the lamina propria as well. Immune cells as well as lymphoid tissue, including lymphoid nodules and capillaries, may be present. Smooth muscle fibers may be in the lamina propria, such as in the intestinal villi. It is practically void of fat cells. Lymphatics penetrate the mucosa and lie below the basement membrane of the epithelium, from there they drain the lamina propria. The fast rate of cell death and regeneration of the epithelium leaves behind many apoptotic cell bodies. These have been found to go into the lamina propria, most of which are inside its macrophages.

== Function ==
=== Role in the immune system ===
Because the epithelium is often under external stress and is somewhat delicate, the lamina propria hosts many immune cells. In the intestinal tract the immune system must have tolerance to the normal intestinal flora, yet respond to pathogenic microorganisms. Imbalance of this causes inflammation diseases such as inflammatory bowel disease. The lamina propria’s richness in macrophages and lymphoid cells makes it a key place for immune responses to occur. It forms part of the barrier that protects internal tissues from external pathogenic microorganisms, especially from the gastrointestinal tract.

== Clinical significance ==
Progression of epithelial cancer often relies on deep and regional lymph node invasion. The lamina propria, being one of the barriers to the submucosa, is an area where epithelial cancer invasion is of significance since lymphatic invasion is an independent predictor of lymph node metastasis, especially in gastric cancer. As soon as the tumors breach the basement membrane and reach the lamina propria, they are exposed to lymphatics which may increase the rate of metastasis and cancer progression. Deeper invasion into the submucosa will increase the exposure to lymphatics.

Long-standing inflammation is a risk factor for the development of cancer. The lamina propria macrophages when under much stress release pro-inflammatory signals that may lead to increased probability of developing cancer. An example of this is the overactivation of the IL-6/STAT3 pathway, which has been linked to colitis-associated cancer.

== See also ==
- Basal lamina (part of which is also known as lamina densa)
- Myofibroblast
- Submucosa
