= Submucosa =

Thin layer of tissue in various organs

- Mucosa; Submucosa; Meissner's plexus Circular muscle Auerbach's plexus longitudinal muscle Serosa or Adventitia

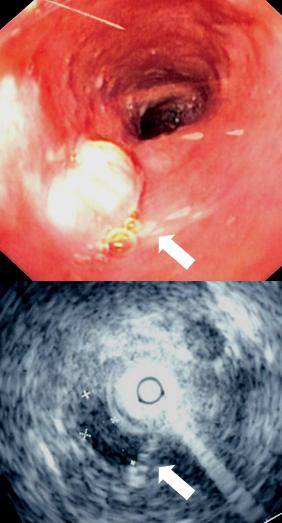
- Endoscopy and radial endoscopic ultrasound images of submucosal tumour in mid-esophagus. The submucosa is seen as a dark ring on the ultrasound image. The arrows are not relevant.

Details

Identifiers
- Latin: tela submucosa
- TA98: A05.3.01.028; A05.4.01.014; A05.5.01.026; A05.6.01.008; A05.7.01.005; A06.4.02.028; A08.3.01.022
- TA2: 2857, 2891, 2913, 2939, 2967, 3221, 3234, 3419
- FMA: 85391

The submucosa (tela submucosa), or submucosal layer, is a thin layer of tissue in various organs of the gastrointestinal, respiratory, and genitourinary tracts. It is the layer of dense irregular connective tissue that supports the mucosa (mucous membrane) and joins it to the muscular layer, the bulk of overlying smooth muscle (fibers running circularly within layer of longitudinal muscle).

The submucosa (sub- + mucosa) is to a mucous membrane what the subserosa (sub- + serosa) is to a serous membrane.

== Structure ==
Blood vessels, lymphatic vessels, and nerves (all supplying the mucosa) will run through here. In the intestinal wall, tiny parasympathetic ganglia are scattered around forming the submucous plexus (or "Meissner's plexus") where preganglionic parasympathetic neurons synapse with postganglionic nerve fibers that supply the muscularis mucosae. Histologically, the wall of the alimentary canal shows four distinct layers (from the lumen moving out): mucosa, submucosa, muscularis externa, and either a serous membrane or an adventitia.

In the gastrointestinal tract and the respiratory tract the submucosa contains the submucosal glands that secrete mucus.

== Clinical significance ==
Identification of the submucosa plays an important role in diagnostic and therapeutic endoscopy, where special fibre-optic cameras are used to perform procedures on the gastrointestinal tract. Abnormalities of the submucosa, such as gastrointestinal stromal tumors, usually show integrity of the mucosal surface.

The submucosa is also identified in endoscopic ultrasound to identify the depth of tumours and to identify other abnormalities. An injection of dye, saline, or epinephrine into the submucosa is imperative in the safe removal of certain polyps.

Endoscopic mucosal resection involves removal of the mucosal layer, and in order to be done safely, a submucosal injection of dye is performed to ensure integrity at the beginning of the procedure.

Female uterine submucosal layers are liable to develop fibroids during pregnancy and are often excised upon discovery.

=== Small intestinal submucosa ===
Small intestinal submucosa (SIS) is submucosal tissue in the small intestines of vertebrates. SIS is harvested (typically from pigs) for transplanted structural material in several clinical applications, typically biologic meshes. They have low immunogenicity. Some uses under investigation include a scaffold for intervertebral disc regeneration.

Unlike other scaffold materials, the resorbable SIS extracellular matrix (SIS-ECM) scaffold is replaced by well-organized host tissues, including differentiated skeletal muscle.

== History ==
A scientific article published in March 2018 proposed a revision of the anatomical definition of the submucosa. They first saw a non compact tissue which should be submucosa using a technology called endomicroscopy. They hypothesised that the submucosa was not compact as it was previously seen on histological analysis but form a reticular pattern. To confirm their findings, they performed fixed samples of bile duct into a freezing media in order to conserve the shape of the submucosa. They then performed a histological analysis and with several staining techniques, they described the submucosa as a network of collagenous bands separating open, formerly fluid-filled spaces. Theses spaces are bordered by fibroblast-like cells CD34 positive. However, these cells are devoid of ultrastructural features indicative of endothelial differentiation, including pinocytotic vesicles and Weibel-Palade bodies.

== Additional images ==
Stomach.

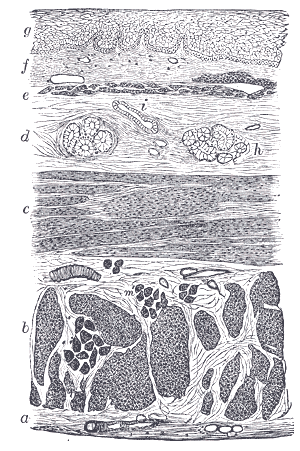
Section of the human esophagus. Moderately magnified.

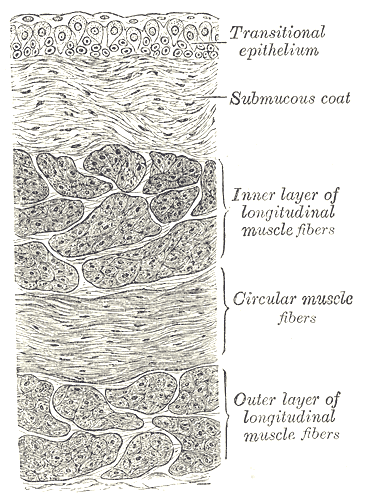
Vertical section of bladder wall.

General structure of the gut wall showing the submucosa.
