= Gastric chief cell =

Type of gastric gland cell

Chief cell
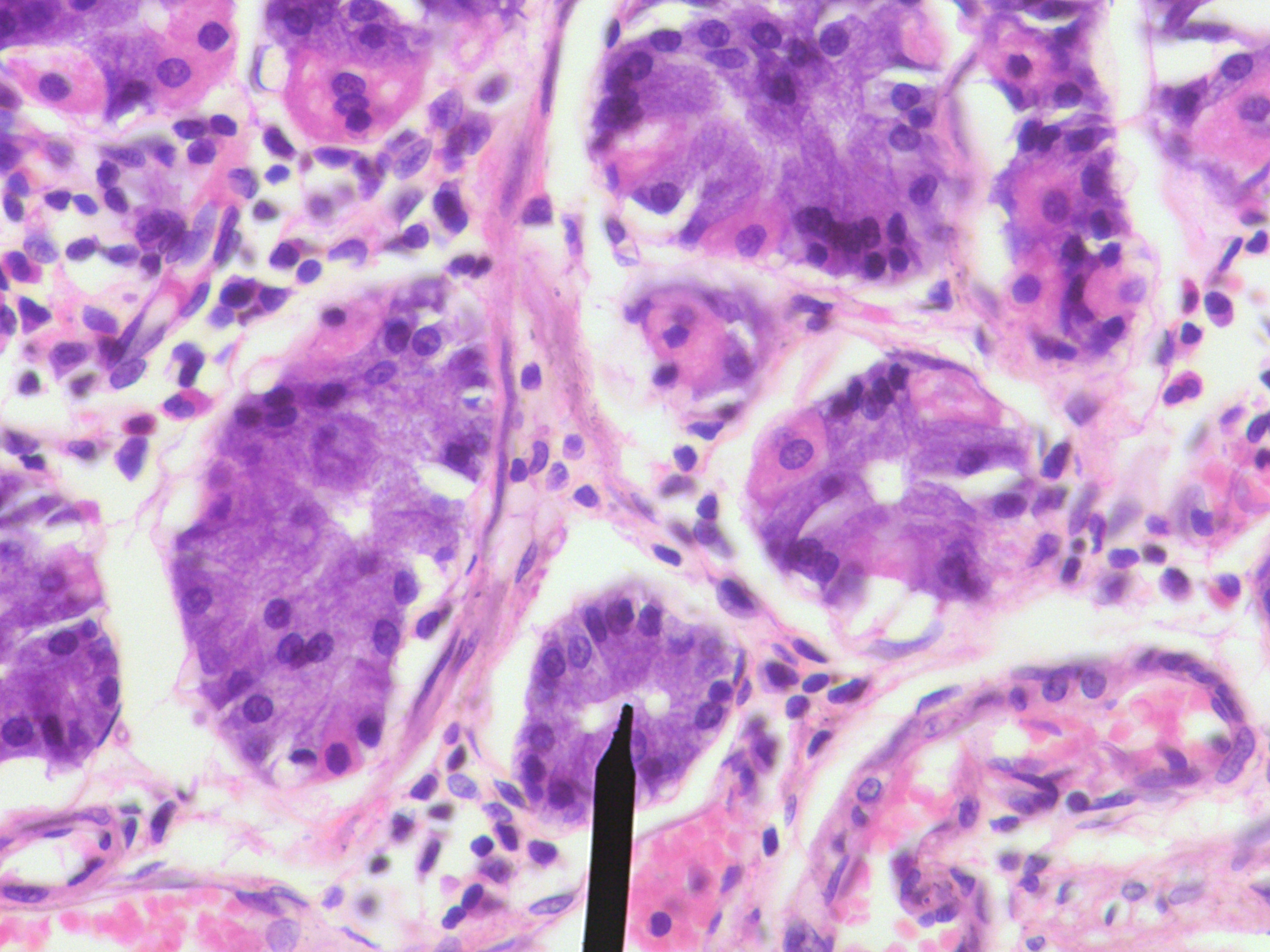
- Human chief cells near tip of RED pointer

Details
- Part of: Stomach
- System: Digestive system

Identifiers
- Latin: exocrinocytus principalis
- MeSH: D019872
- TH: H3.04.02.1.00031
- FMA: 62902

A gastric chief cell, peptic cell, or gastric zymogenic cell is a type of gastric gland cell that releases pepsinogen and gastric lipase. It is the cell responsible for secretion of chymosin (rennin) in ruminant animals and some other animals. The cell stains basophilic upon H&E staining due to the large proportion of rough endoplasmic reticulum in its cytoplasm. Gastric chief cells are generally located deep in the mucosal layer of the stomach lining, in the fundus and body of the stomach.

Chief cells release the zymogen (enzyme precursor) pepsinogen when stimulated by a variety of factors including cholinergic activity from the vagus nerve and acidic condition in the stomach. Gastrin and secretin may also act as secretagogues.

It works in conjunction with the parietal cell, which releases gastric acid, converting the pepsinogen into pepsin.

== Nomenclature ==
The terms chief cell and zymogenic cell are often used without the word "gastric" to name this type of cell. However, those terms can also be used to describe other cell types (for example, parathyroid chief cells). Chief cells are also known as peptic cells.

== Function ==
Pepsinogen is activated into the digestive enzyme pepsin when it comes in contact with hydrochloric acid produced by gastric parietal cells. This type of cell also secretes gastric lipase enzymes, which help digest triglycerides into free fatty acids and di- and mono-glycerides. There is also evidence that the gastric chief cell secretes leptin in response to the presence of food in the stomach. Leptin has been found in the pepsinogen granules of chief cells.

Chief cells also produce the acidic mammalian chitinase (CHIA, AMCase), a chitin-digesting enzyme resistant to pepsin digestion. AMCase production requires a local type 2 immune response.

== Lifespan ==
Gastric pit cells are replaced every 2–4 days. This high rate of turnover is a protective mechanism designed to protect the epithelial lining of the stomach from both the proteolytic action of pepsin and the acid produced by parietal cells. Gastric chief cells are much longer lived and are believed to differentiate from stem cells located higher in the gastric unit in the isthmus. These stem cells differentiate into mucous neck cells in the isthmus and transition into chief cells as they migrate towards the base. Since the mucus neck cells do not divide as it becomes a chief cell this process is known as transdifferentiation. The gene Mist1 has been shown to regulate mucus neck cell to chief cell transdifferentiation and plays a role in the normal development of the chief cell organelles and structures.

== Histology ==
Gastric chief cells are epithelial cells which are found within the gastric unit or gastric gland, and form the base of the gastric unit. The gastric chief cell has an extensive network of lamellar rough endoplasmic reticulum organized around the nucleus. The gastric chief cell also contains many large secretory vesicles filled with digestive enzymes in the apical cytoplasm.

== Diseases ==
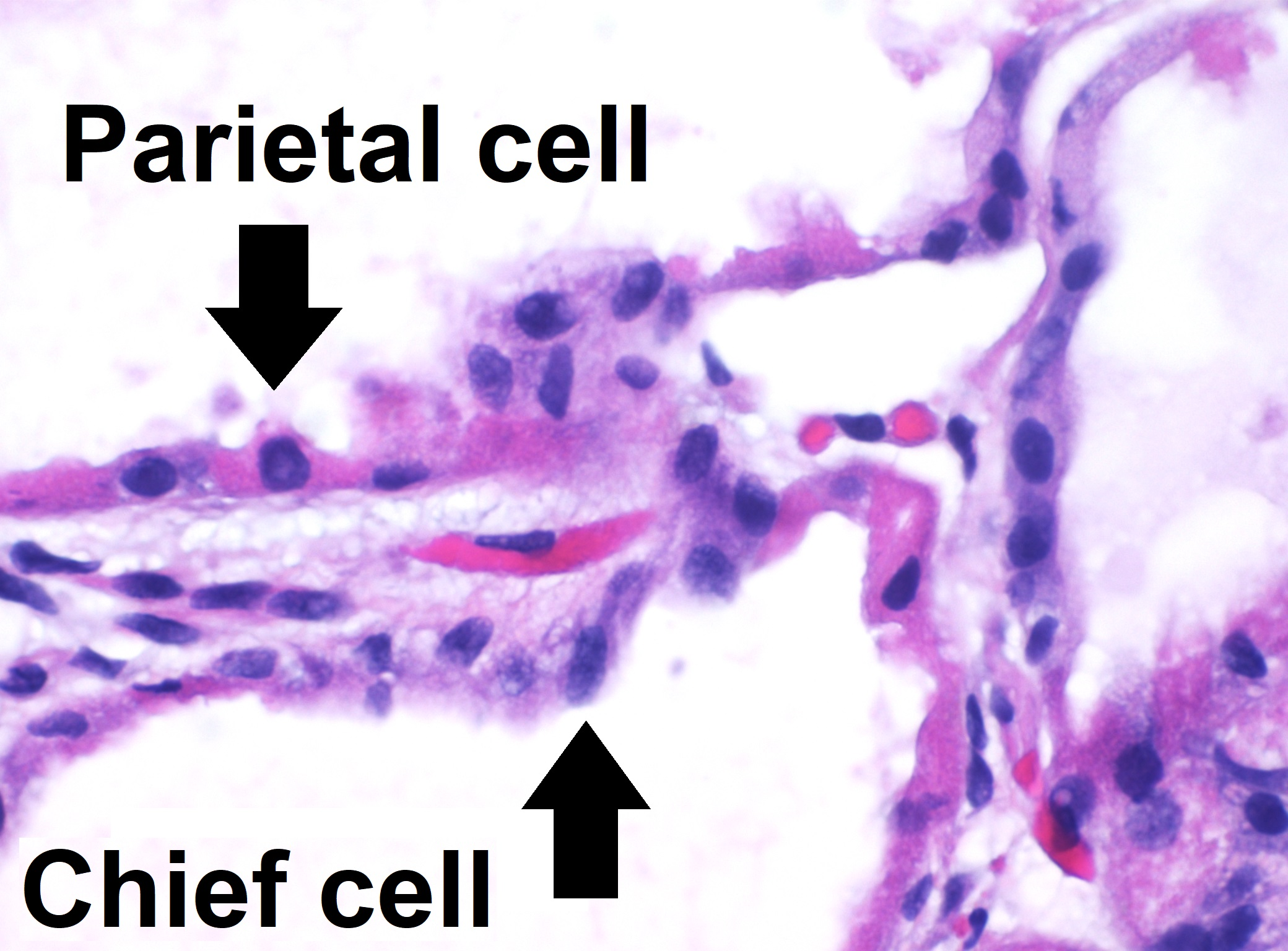
Chief cells are part of fundic gland polyps (here shown in high magnification).

In gastric tissue, a loss of parietal cells due to chronic inflammation has been shown to affect chief cell differentiation and can induce chief cells to transdifferentiate back into neck cells and can lead to the formation of mucus cell metaplasia known as spasmolytic polypeptide expressing metaplasia (SPEM) that could be precancerous. If parietal cells are lost, mature chief cells do not form. Parietal cells may secrete factors that lead to transdifferentiation of chief cells, so if lost, chief cells do not normally develop.

== See also ==
- Gastric acid
- Fundic glands
- List of human cell types derived from the germ layers
