= Muscular layer =

Layer of many organs in vertebrates

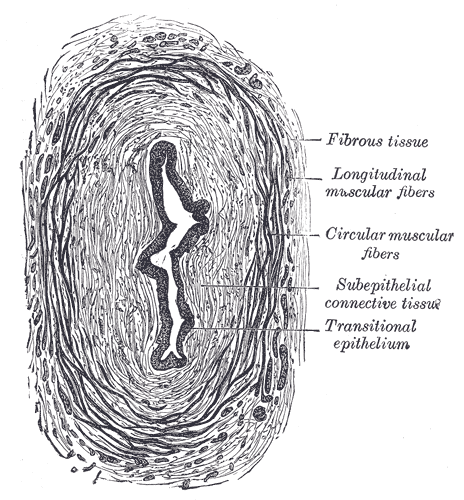
- Histological section of the ureter, showing the thick muscular layers surrounding the lumen.

Details

Identifiers
- Latin: tunica muscularis
- TA98: A05.4.01.010; A05.5.01.021; A05.6.01.004; A05.7.01.004; A05.7.03.011; A05.7.04.009; A05.8.02.008; A08.1.05.010; A08.2.01.006; A08.3.01.010; A09.1.02.012; A09.1.04.010; A09.2.03.007; A09.3.05.009; A09.4.02.011; A09.3.06.003; A09.4.02.018; A09.4.02.027

The muscular layer (muscle layer, muscular coat, muscular fibers, muscularis propria, muscularis externa) is a region of muscle in many organs in the vertebrate body, adjacent to the submucosa. It is responsible for gut movement such as peristalsis. The Latin, tunica muscularis, may also be used.

== Structure ==
It usually has two layers of smooth muscle:

- inner and "circular"
- outer and "longitudinal"

However, there are some exceptions to this pattern.

- In the stomach, there are three layers to the muscular layer. Stomach contains an additional oblique muscle layer just interior to circular muscle layer.
- In the upper esophagus, part of the externa is skeletal muscle, rather than smooth muscle.
- In the vas deferens of the spermatic cord, there are three layers: inner longitudinal, middle circular, and outer longitudinal.
- In the ureter, the smooth muscle orientation is opposite that of the GI tract. There is an inner longitudinal and an outer circular layer.

The inner layer of the muscularis externa forms a sphincter at two locations of the gastrointestinal tract:

- in the pylorus of the stomach, it forms the pyloric sphincter.
- in the anal canal, it forms the internal anal sphincter.

In the colon, the fibres of the external longitudinal smooth muscle layer are collected into three longitudinal bands, the teniae coli.

The thickest muscularis layer is found in the stomach (triple layered) and thus maximum peristalsis occurs in the stomach. Thinnest muscularis layer in the alimentary canal is found in the rectum, where minimum peristalsis occurs.

== Function ==
The muscularis layer is responsible for the peristaltic movements and segmental contractions in and the alimentary canal. The Auerbach's nerve plexus (myenteric nerve plexus) is found between longitudinal and circular muscle layers, it starts muscle contractions to initiate peristalsis.
