= Muscularis mucosae =

Thin layer of muscle of the gastrointestinal tract

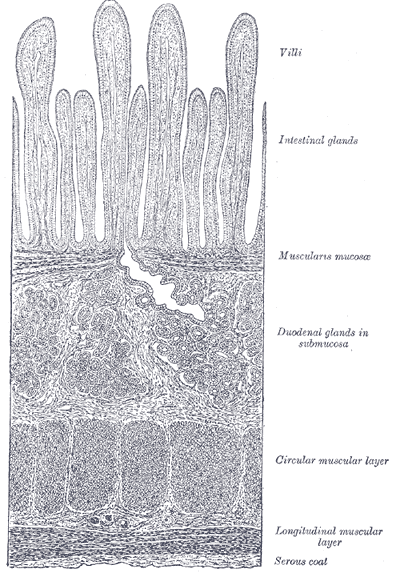
- Section of duodenum of cat. X 60. (Muscularis mucosae labeled at right, third from the top.)

Details

Identifiers
- Latin: lamina muscularis mucosae
- TA98: A05.4.01.016
- FMA: 68413

The muscularis mucosae (or lamina muscularis mucosae) is a thin layer (lamina) of muscle of the gastrointestinal tract, located outside the lamina propria, and separating it from the submucosa. It is present in a continuous fashion from the esophagus to the upper rectum (the exact nomenclature of the rectum's muscle layers is still being debated). A discontinuous muscularis mucosae–like muscle layer is present in the urinary tract, from the renal pelvis to the bladder; as it is discontinuous, it should not be regarded as a true muscularis mucosae.

In the gastrointestinal tract, the term mucosa or mucous membrane refers to the combination of epithelium, lamina propria, and (where it occurs) muscularis mucosae. The etymology suggests this, since the Latin names translate to "the mucosa's own special layer" (lamina propria mucosae) and "muscular layer of the mucosa" (lamina muscularis mucosae).

The muscularis mucosae is composed of several thin layers of smooth muscle fibers oriented in different ways which keep the mucosal surface and underlying glands in a constant state of gentle agitation to expel contents of glandular crypts and enhance contact between epithelium and the contents of the lumen.

== Additional images ==
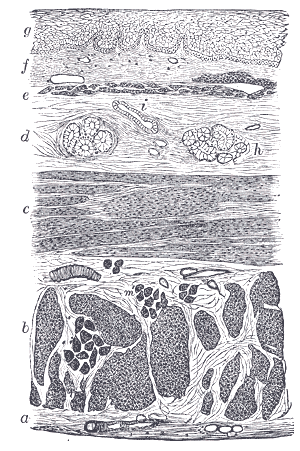
Section of the human esophagus. Moderately magnified.

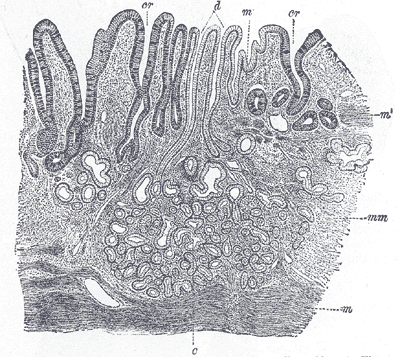
Section of mucous membrane of human stomach, near the cardiac orifice.

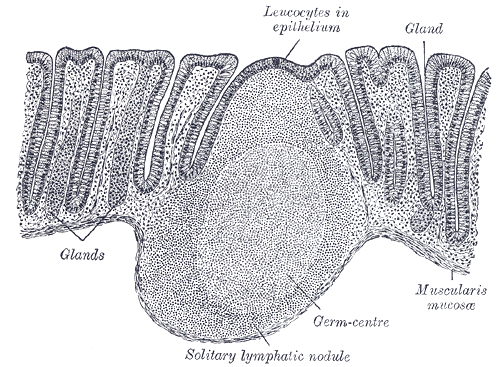
Section of mucous membrane of human rectum. X 60.

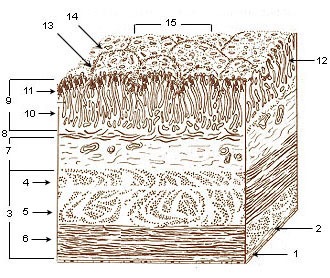
Layers of stomach wall

General structure of the gut wall showing the Muscularis mucosa.
