= Enterochromaffin-like cell =

Type of digestive system cell

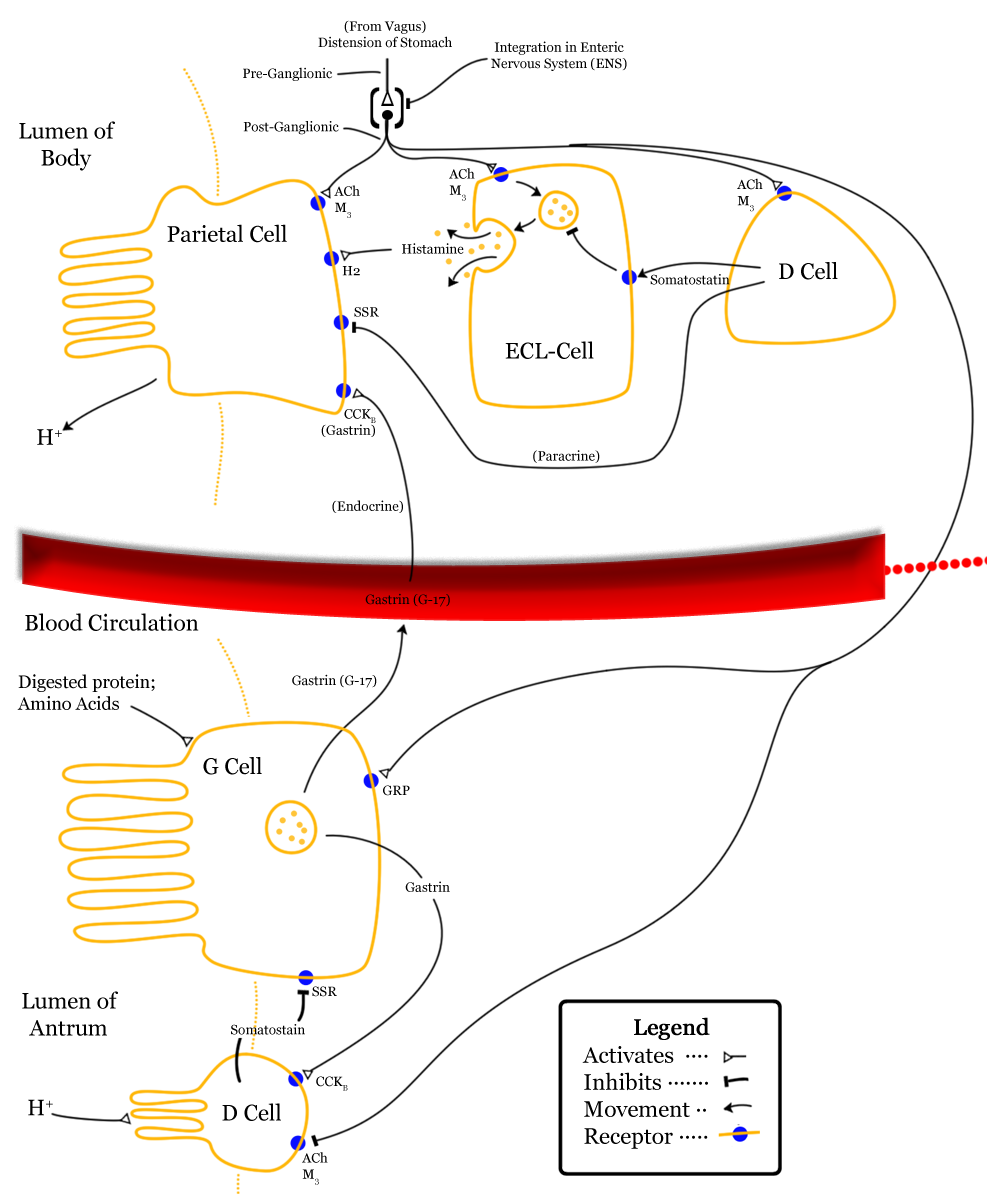
- Control of stomach acid secretions. (ECL-cell at top center.)

Details
- Location: Gastric mucosa

Identifiers
- Latin: endocrinocytus ECL
- MeSH: D019861
- TH: H3.04.02.0.00030

Enterochromaffin-like cells or ECL cells are a type of neuroendocrine cell found in the gastric glands of the gastric mucosa beneath the epithelium, in particular in the vicinity of parietal cells, that aid in the production of gastric acid via the release of histamine. They are also considered a type of enteroendocrine cell.

== Function ==
Histamine

ECL cells synthesize and secrete histamine. These cells are stimulated by the hormones gastrin (not depicted in the adjacent diagram) and pituitary adenylyl cyclase-activating peptide. G cells are stimulated by vagal stimulation through the neurotransmitter gastrin-releasing peptide; this causes the G cells to secrete gastrin, which in turn stimulates ECL cells to release histamine. Note that this circuit is not activated by acetylcholine (ACh), which is of particular importance because the administration of atropine will not block the vagal stimulation of the G cells, as ACh is not the neurotransmitter for these cells.

However, ECL cells are activated directly by ACh on M1 receptors from direct vagal innervation leading to histamine release. This pathway will be inhibited by atropine.

Gastrin is transferred from a specific type of G cell in the gastric epithelium to the ECL cells by blood. Histamine and gastrin act synergistically as the most important stimulators of hydrochloric acid secretion from parietal cells and stimulators of secretion of pepsinogen from chief cells. The most important inhibitor of the ECL cell is somatostatin from D cells.

Enterochromaffin-like cells also produce pancreastatin and probably other peptide hormones and growth factors.

== Clinical significance ==
Enterochromaffin-like (ECL) cell hyperplasia in the gastric mucosa (yellow arrows) in a case of atrophic gastritis. H&E stain.

A prolonged stimulation of these cells causes their hyperplasia and gastric neuroendocrine tumors (NETs). This is especially important in gastrinoma (the tumors in which there is an excessive secretion of gastrin), as this is one of the factors contributing to Zollinger–Ellison's syndrome]. ECL hyperplasia can also occur in atrophic gastritis, particularly autoimmune gastritis, where the loss of gastric parietal cells reduces acid secretion, causing compensatory hypergastrinemia that stimulates ECL-cell proliferation. The World Health Organization now recognizes that chronic use of proton-pump inhibitors can cause ECL hyperplasia and gastric NET.

== History ==
The name is derived from their location in the enteric system and their chromaffin-like staining pattern in histologic sections, which is characterized by silver staining.

== See also ==
- List of distinct cell types in the adult human body
- Enterochromaffin cell
- Chromaffin cell
- List of human cell types derived from the germ layers
