= Gastrointestinal hormone =

Hormones produced in the GI

The gastrointestinal hormones (or gut hormones) constitute a group of hormones secreted by enteroendocrine cells in the stomach, pancreas, and small intestine that control various functions of the digestive organs. Later studies showed that most of the gut peptides, such as secretin, cholecystokinin or substance P, were found to play a role of neurotransmitters and neuromodulators in the central and peripheral nervous systems.

Enteroendocrine cells do not form glands but are spread throughout the digestive tract. They exert their autocrine and paracrine actions that integrate gastrointestinal function.

== Types ==
The gastrointestinal hormones can be divided into three main groups based upon their chemical structure.

- Gastrin–cholecystokinin family: gastrin and cholecystokinin
- Secretin family: secretin, glucagon, vasoactive intestinal peptide and gastric inhibitory peptide
- Somatostatin family
- Motilin family
- Substance P.

Ghrelin is a peptide hormone released from the stomach and liver and is often referred to as the "hunger hormone" since high levels of it are found in individuals that are fasting. Ghrelin agonistic treatments can be used to treat illnesses such as anorexia and loss of appetites in cancer patients. Ghrelin treatments for obesity are still under intense scrutiny and no conclusive evidence has been reached. This hormone stimulates growth hormone release. Amylin controls glucose homeostasis and gastric motility

Glucose-dependent insulinotropic polypeptide possesses an acute influence on food intake through its effects on adipocytes

Oxyntomodulin plays a role in controlling acid secretion and satiation

Characteristics of prominent forms of principal gut regulatory peptides
Hormone or peptide	Molecular weight (Da)	Number of amino acids	Main gut localization	Principal physiologic actions
Gastrin family				
Cholecystokinin	3918	33 (also 385, 59)	Duodenum and jejunum, Enteric nerves	Stimulates gallbladder contraction and intestinal motility; stimulates secretion of pancreatic enzymes, insulin, glucagon, and pancreatic polypeptides; has a role in indicating satiety; the C-terminal 8 amino acid peptide cholecystokinin (CCK)-8 retains full activity
Little gastrin	2098	17	Both forms of gastrin are found in the gastric antrum and duodenum	Gastrins stimulate the secretion of gastric acid, pepsinogen, intrinsic factor, and secretin; stimulate intestinal mucosal growth; increase gastric and intestinal motility
Big gastrin	3839	34	Both forms of gastrin are found in the gastric antrum and duodenum	Gastrins stimulate the secretion of gastric acid, pepsinogen, intrinsic factor, and secretin; stimulate intestinal mucosal growth; increase gastric and intestinal motility
Secretin-glucagon family				
Secretin	3056	27	Duodenum and jejunum	Stimulates pancreatic secretion of HCO_{3}, enzymes and insulin; reduces gastric and duodenal motility, inhibits gastrin release and gastric acid secretion
Vasoactive intestinal polypeptide (VIP)	3326	28	Enteric nerves	Relaxes smooth muscle of gut, blood vessels, and genitourinary system; increases water and electrolyte secretion from pancreas and gut; releases hormones from pancreas, gut, and hypothalamus
Glucose-dependent insulinotropic	4976	42	Duodenum and jejunum	Stimulates insulin release; reduces gastric and intestinal motility; increases fluid and electrolyte secretion from small intestine

Brief Description of Some GI Regulatory Peptides
Hormone or peptide	Major tissue locations in the gut	Principal known actions
Bombesin	Throughout the gut and pancreas	Stimulates release of cholecystokinin (CCK) and gastrin
Calcitonin gene-related peptide	Enteric nerves	Unclear
Chromogranin A	Neuroendocrine cells	Secretory protein
Enkephalins	Stomach, duodenum	Opiate-like actions
Enteroglucagon	Small intestine, pancreas	Inhibits insulin secretion
Galanin	Enteric nerves	
Ghrelin	Stomach	Stimulates appetite, increases gastric emptying
Glucagon-like peptide 1	Pancreas, ileum	Increases insulin secretion
Glucagon-like peptide 2	Ileum, colon	Enterocyte-specific growth hormone
Growth factors	Throughout the gut	Cell proliferation and differentiation
Growth hormone-releasing factor	Small intestine	Unclear
Leptin	Stomach	Appetite control
Motilin	Throughout the gut	Increases gastric emptying and small bowel motility
Neuropeptide Y	Enteric nerves	Regulation of intestinal blood flow
Neurotensin	Ileum	Affects gut motility; increases jejunal and ileal fluid secretion
Pancreatic polypeptide	Pancreas	Inhibits pancreatic and biliary secretion
Peptide YY	Colon	Inhibits food intake
Somatostatin	Stomach, pancreas	Inhibits secretion and action of many hormones
Substance P	Enteric nerves	Unclear
Trefoil peptides	Stomach, intestine	Mucosal protection and repair

== See also ==
- Hormone, endocrine system
- Digestive system, gastrointestinal tract
- Peptide YY
