= Big gastrin =

Big Gastrin
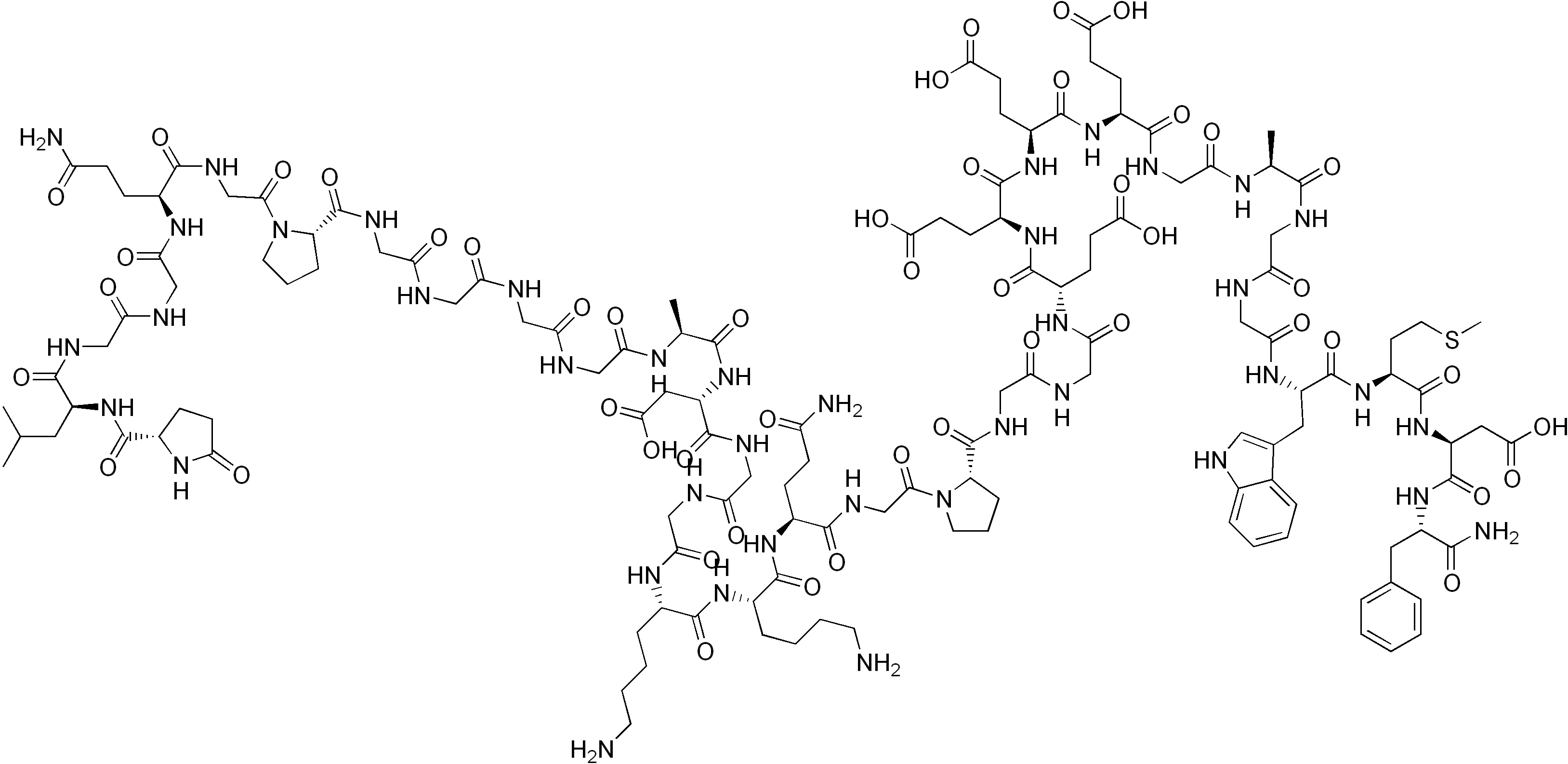

Names
- IUPAC name H-Pyr-Leu-Gly-Gly-Gln-Gly-Pro-Gly-Gly-Gly-Gly-Ala-Asp-Gly-Gly-Lys-Lys-Gln-Gly-Pro-Gly-Gly-Glu-Glu-Glu-Glu-Gly-Ala-Gly-Gly-Trp-Met-Asp-Phe-NH2
- Systematic IUPAC name L-pyroglutamyl-L-leucyl-glycyl-glycyl-L-glutaminyl-glycyl-L-prolyl-glycyl-glycyl-glycyl-glycyl-L-alanyl-L-alpha-aspartyl-glycyl-glycyl-L-lysyl-L-lysyl-L-glutaminyl-glycyl-L-prolyl-glycyl-glycyl-L-alpha-glutamyl-L-alpha-glutamyl-L-alpha-glutamyl-L-alpha-glutamyl-glycyl-L-alanyl-glycyl-glycyl-L-tryptophyl-L-methionyl-L-alpha-aspartyl-L-phenylalaninamide
- Other names Pro-gastrin, Big-Gastrin, G-34, Gastrin-34

Identifiers
| CAS Number | 53988-98-0 |
| 3D model (JSmol) | Interactive image |
| ChEBI | CHEBI:75437 |
| ChemSpider | 17288965 |
| PubChem CID | 16132306 |
| UNII | 3BL184GALN |
- InChI: InChI=1S/C132H194N40O49S/c1-66(2)45-84(169-125(214)78-27-34-92(175)156-78)120(209)147-54-96(179)143-60-103(186)158-75(25-32-90(135)173)117(206)152-64-106(189)171-42-15-23-88(171)131(220)150-56-98(181)140-51-93(176)139-52-94(177)141-58-100(183)155-68(4)116(205)168-86(48-112(199)200)121(210)148-55-97(180)142-59-102(185)157-73(21-11-13-40-133)122(211)161-74(22-12-14-41-134)123(212)162-76(26-33-91(136)174)119(208)153-65-107(190)172-43-16-24-89(172)132(221)151-57-99(182)144-61-104(187)159-79(29-36-109(193)194)124(213)164-81(31-38-111(197)198)127(216)165-80(30-37-110(195)196)126(215)163-77(28-35-108(191)192)118(207)149-63-101(184)154-67(3)115(204)146-53-95(178)145-62-105(188)160-85(47-70-50-138-72-20-10-9-19-71(70)72)129(218)166-82(39-44-222-5)128(217)170-87(49-113(201)202)130(219)167-83(114(137)203)46-69-17-7-6-8-18-69/h6-10,17-20,50,66-68,73-89,138H,11-16,21-49,51-65,133-134H2,1-5H3,(H2,135,173)(H2,136,174)(H2,137,203)(H,139,176)(H,140,181)(H,141,177)(H,142,180)(H,143,179)(H,144,182)(H,145,178)(H,146,204)(H,147,209)(H,148,210)(H,149,207)(H,150,220)(H,151,221)(H,152,206)(H,153,208)(H,154,184)(H,155,183)(H,156,175)(H,157,185)(H,158,186)(H,159,187)(H,160,188)(H,161,211)(H,162,212)(H,163,215)(H,164,213)(H,165,216)(H,166,218)(H,167,219)(H,168,205)(H,169,214)(H,170,217)(H,191,192)(H,193,194)(H,195,196)(H,197,198)(H,199,200)(H,201,202)/t67-,68-,73-,74-,75-,76-,77-,78-,79-,80-,81-,82-,83-,84-,85-,86-,87-,88-,89-/m0/s1 Key: RZIMNEGTIDYAGZ-HNSJZBNRSA-N; InChI=1/C132H194N40O49S/c1-66(2)45-84(169-125(214)78-27-34-92(175)156-78)120(209)147-54-96(179)143-60-103(186)158-75(25-32-90(135)173)117(206)152-64-106(189)171-42-15-23-88(171)131(220)150-56-98(181)140-51-93(176)139-52-94(177)141-58-100(183)155-68(4)116(205)168-86(48-112(199)200)121(210)148-55-97(180)142-59-102(185)157-73(21-11-13-40-133)122(211)161-74(22-12-14-41-134)123(212)162-76(26-33-91(136)174)119(208)153-65-107(190)172-43-16-24-89(172)132(221)151-57-99(182)144-61-104(187)159-79(29-36-109(193)194)124(213)164-81(31-38-111(197)198)127(216)165-80(30-37-110(195)196)126(215)163-77(28-35-108(191)192)118(207)149-63-101(184)154-67(3)115(204)146-53-95(178)145-62-105(188)160-85(47-70-50-138-72-20-10-9-19-71(70)72)129(218)166-82(39-44-222-5)128(217)170-87(49-113(201)202)130(219)167-83(114(137)203)46-69-17-7-6-8-18-69/h6-10,17-20,50,66-68,73-89,138H,11-16,21-49,51-65,133-134H2,1-5H3,(H2,135,173)(H2,136,174)(H2,137,203)(H,139,176)(H,140,181)(H,141,177)(H,142,180)(H,143,179)(H,144,182)(H,145,178)(H,146,204)(H,147,209)(H,148,210)(H,149,207)(H,150,220)(H,151,221)(H,152,206)(H,153,208)(H,154,184)(H,155,183)(H,156,175)(H,157,185)(H,158,186)(H,159,187)(H,160,188)(H,161,211)(H,162,212)(H,163,215)(H,164,213)(H,165,216)(H,166,218)(H,167,219)(H,168,205)(H,169,214)(H,170,217)(H,191,192)(H,193,194)(H,195,196)(H,197,198)(H,199,200)(H,201,202)/t67-,68-,73-,74-,75-,76-,77-,78-,79-,80-,81-,82-,83-,84-,85-,86-,87-,88-,89-/m0/s1 Key: RZIMNEGTIDYAGZ-HNSJZBNRBP
- SMILES: CC(C)CC(C(=O)NCC(=O)NCC(=O)NC(CCC(=O)N)C(=O)NCC(=O)N1CCCC1C(=O)NCC(=O)NCC(=O)NCC(=O)NCC(=O)NC(C)C(=O)NC(CC(=O)O)C(=O)NCC(=O)NCC(=O)NC(CCCCN)C(=O)NC(CCCCN)C(=O)NC(CCC(=O)N)C(=O)NCC(=O)N2CCCC2C(=O)NCC(=O)NCC(=O)NC(CCC(=O)O)C(=O)NC(CCC(=O)O)C(=O)NC(CCC(=O)O)C(=O)NC(CCC(=O)O)C(=O)NCC(=O)NC(C)C(=O)NCC(=O)NCC(=O)NC(Cc3c[nH]c4c3cccc4)C(=O)NC(CCSC)C(=O)NC(CC(=O)O)C(=O)NC(Cc5ccccc5)C(=O)N)NC(=O)C6CCC(=O)N6

Properties
| Chemical formula | C_{132}H_{194}N_{40}O_{49}S |
| Molar mass | 3157.30 g·mol^{−1} |
- Except where otherwise noted, data are given for materials in their standard state (at 25 °C [77 °F], 100 kPa). verify (what is ?) Infobox references

Big gastrin (G-34) is a form of gastrin with 34 amino acids in its sequence. Big gastrin is a hormone produced by G cells and can be found inside of the stomach. G-34 promotes the secretion of gastric acid in dogs. In dogs, the half life of this peptide is between 14.7 and 16.8 minutes. In humans, an over production of this hormone by gastrinomas leads to Zollinger–Ellison syndrome.

== Responses to foods ==
Big gastrin is one form of gastrin predominate in circulation after a meal, another major form is called little gastrin (G17). Both forms of gastrin have been isolated from human gastrinoma and hog antral mucosa. G34 is carboxy-amidated and can be sulphated or unsulphated at the tyrosine residues. Binding of gastrin to the receptors in stomach can cause the secretion of hydrochloric acids (HCl), the gastric acid. Duodenal ulcer patients tend to have higher than normal basal and maximal rate of gastric acid secretion, while gastric ulcer patients have lower than normal basal and maximal of gastric acid output. Comparing G34 in normal and peptic ulcer subjects by using radioimmunoassay in fasting serum and after feeding, basal G34 was found similar in normal and duodenal ulcer but raised in gastric ulcer before meal. After a meal, the concentration of G34 was increased in both duodenal ulcer patients and gastric ulcer patients, which significantly higher than normal people.
