= Little gastrin I =

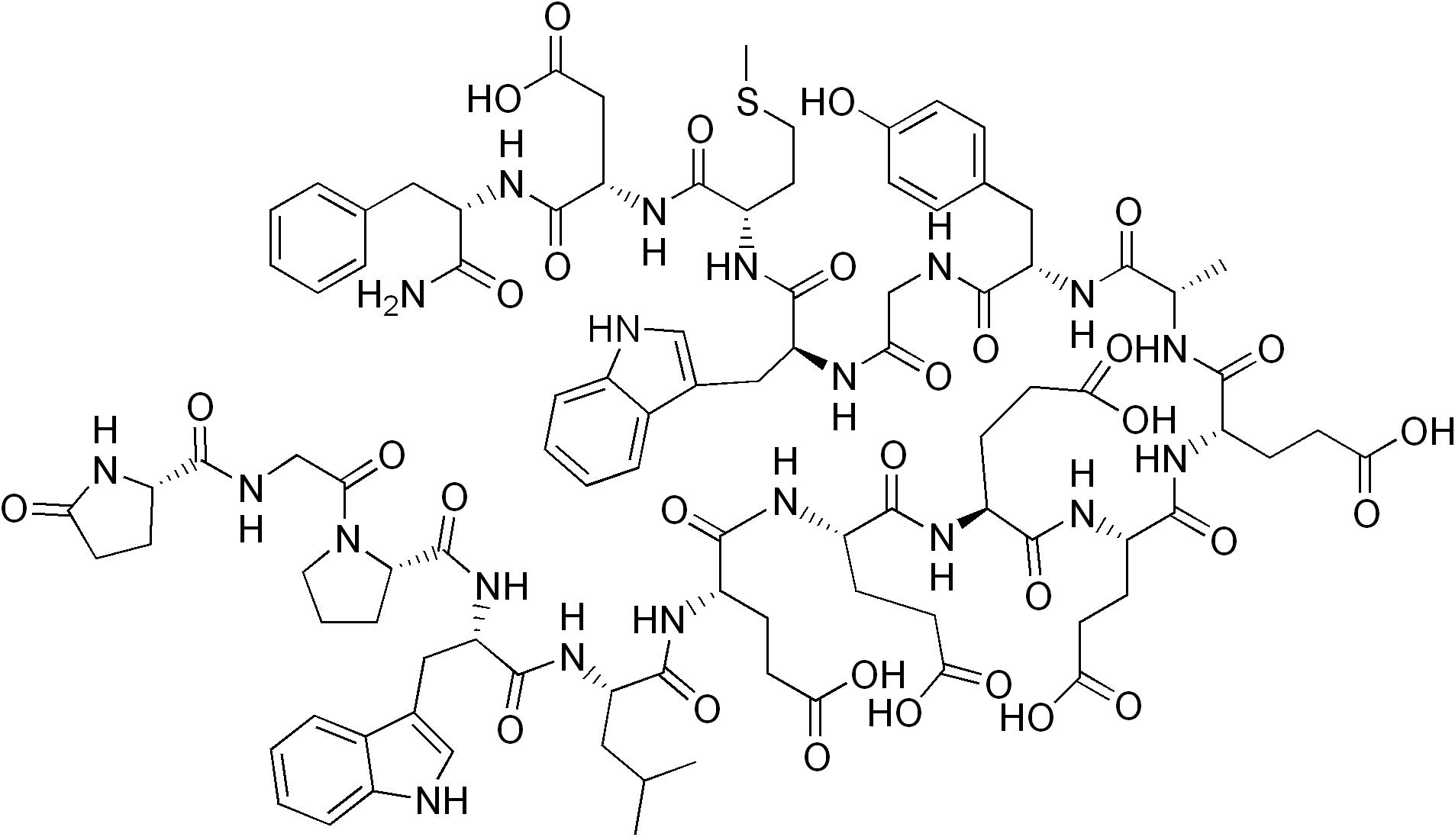

Names
- Other names Gastrin I; Human gastrin I; pGlu-Gly-Pro-Trp-Leu-Glu-Glu-Glu-Glu-Glu-Ala-Tyr-Gly-Trp-Met-Asp-Phe-NH_{2}

Identifiers
CAS Number	10047-33-3
3D model (JSmol)	Interactive image
ChEBI	CHEBI:75441
ChEMBL	ChEMBL4451154
ChemSpider	17314806
EC Number	233-157-0
IUPHAR/BPS	3559
PubChem CID	16162108
UNII	L6G91DE14D
CompTox Dashboard (EPA)	DTXSID601028770
- InChI: InChI=1S/C97H124N20O31S/c1-49(2)39-68(114-95(146)71(43-54-46-100-59-18-11-9-16-57(54)59)116-97(148)73-19-12-37-117(73)76(121)48-102-85(136)60-24-30-74(119)104-60)93(144)110-65(29-35-81(130)131)91(142)109-64(28-34-80(128)129)90(141)108-63(27-33-79(126)127)89(140)107-62(26-32-78(124)125)88(139)106-61(25-31-77(122)123)87(138)103-50(3)84(135)113-69(41-52-20-22-55(118)23-21-52)86(137)101-47-75(120)105-70(42-53-45-99-58-17-10-8-15-56(53)58)94(145)111-66(36-38-149-4)92(143)115-72(44-82(132)133)96(147)112-67(83(98)134)40-51-13-6-5-7-14-51/h5-11,13-18,20-23,45-46,49-50,60-73,99-100,118H,12,19,24-44,47-48H2,1-4H3,(H2,98,134)(H,101,137)(H,102,136)(H,103,138)(H,104,119)(H,105,120)(H,106,139)(H,107,140)(H,108,141)(H,109,142)(H,110,144)(H,111,145)(H,112,147)(H,113,135)(H,114,146)(H,115,143)(H,116,148)(H,122,123)(H,124,125)(H,126,127)(H,128,129)(H,130,131)(H,132,133)/t50-,60-,61-,62-,63-,64-,65-,66-,67-,68-,69-,70-,71-,72-,73-/m0/s1 Key: GKDWRERMBNGKCZ-RNXBIMIWSA-N
- SMILES: C[C@@H](C(=O)N[C@@H](CC1=CC=C(C=C1)O)C(=O)NCC(=O)N[C@@H](CC2=CNC3=CC=CC=C32)C(=O)N[C@@H](CCSC)C(=O)N[C@@H](CC(=O)O)C(=O)N[C@@H](CC4=CC=CC=C4)C(=O)N)NC(=O)[C@H](CCC(=O)O)NC(=O)[C@H](CCC(=O)O)NC(=O)[C@H](CCC(=O)O)NC(=O)[C@H](CCC(=O)O)NC(=O)[C@H](CCC(=O)O)NC(=O)[C@H](CC(C)C)NC(=O)[C@H](CC5=CNC6=CC=CC=C65)NC(=O)[C@@H]7CCCN7C(=O)CNC(=O)[C@@H]8CCC(=O)N8

Properties
Chemical formula	C_{97}H_{124}N_{20}O_{31}S
Molar mass	2098.20 g/mol
- Except where otherwise noted, data are given for materials in their standard state (at 25 °C [77 °F], 100 kPa). verify (what is ?) Infobox references

Little gastrin I, also known as gastrin-17 or G-17, is a 17-amino acid peptide hormone and the most abundant form of gastrin found in healthy individuals.It is produced primarily by G-cells in the gastric antrum and plays a key role in regulating gastric acid secretion and digestion.

The existence of gastrin was first proposed by British physiologist John Sydney Edkins in 1905, though its structure was not fully worked out until the 1960s. Little gastrin I is synthesized from a larger precursor protein called preprogastrin, which undergoes several processing steps before producing the mature hormone. It stimulates parietal cells in the stomach to secrete hydrochloric acid and is involved in gastric motility and the release of pepsin and intrinsic factor. Its release is triggered by food intake and inhibited by low stomach pH, forming a negative feedback loop. Abnormally high levels of gastrin, known as hypergastrinemia, are associated with conditions such as atrophic gastritis, pernicious anemia, and gastric cancer.

== History ==
The idea that the stomach produces a hormone to trigger acid secretion was first put forward by British physiologist John Sydney Edkins in 1905. Working with cats, he found that injecting extracts from the stomach lining causes an increase in acid production, and he called the substance responsible "gastrin". His theory was met with skepticism after histamine was discovered in 1910, as it had a similar effect on the stomach, leading many scientists to doubt whether gastrin was a separate hormone at all.

The debate was largely settled in 1942, when Simon Komarov published research showing that a gastrin extract could stimulate acid secretion on its own, separate from histamine. Building on this work, Roderic Gregory and Hilda Tracy isolated the hormone in purified form in the early 1960s and identified two closely related versions, which they named gastrin I and gastrin II. Chemist George Kenner then determined the full amino acid sequence of both peptides, making gastrin the first gut hormone to have its complete structure worked out.

== Biosynthesis ==
Little gastrin I is synthesized from a 101-amino acid precursor protein called preprogastrin. A signal peptide of 21 amino acids is removed in the endoplasmic reticulum, producing the 80-amino acid intermediate progastrin. Progastrin is then cleaved at specific site by proprotein convertase as it moves through the golgi apparatus toward secretory vesicles, producing gastrin-34 and gastrin-17 as the two major biologically active end products. In the normal human stomach, around 85% of amidated gastrin in the antral mucosa is in the G-17 form.

== Structure ==
Little gastrin I consists of 17 amino acids with an amidated C-terminus. It is derived from a larger precursor molecule, preprogastrin, which undergoes several processing steps before producing the mature hormone. Gastrin II has identical amino acid composition to Gastrin I, the only difference is that the single tyrosine residue is sulfated in Gastrin II.

== Function ==
Little gastrin I stimulates parietal cell in the stomach to secrete hydrochloric acid. It does this partly by binding directly to cholecystokinin B receptor on parietal cells, and partly by triggering enterochromaffin-like cell to release histamine, which then acts on parietal cells. Beyond acid secretion, it also plays a role in gastric motility and then release of pepsin and intrinsic factor.

== Secretion and regulation ==
Release of little gastrin I is triggered by the presence of proteins and amino acids in the stomach, gastric distension as well as elevated stomach pH. The release is also promoted by vagal nerve stimulation. Secretion is inhibited by somatostatin and by acidic gastric pH. This forms a negative feedback loop. Its half-life in circulation is short, around 3-7 minutes, after which it is mainly broken down by the kidneys.

== Clinical significance ==
Abnormally high levels of gastrin, known as hypergastrinemia, can result from conditions such as atrophic gastritis and pernicious anemia. Gastrin-17 has also been studied in relation to gastric cancer, as elevated levels may contribute to tumor growth in the stomach lining.
