= Enteroendocrine cell =

Cell that produces gastrointestinal hormones

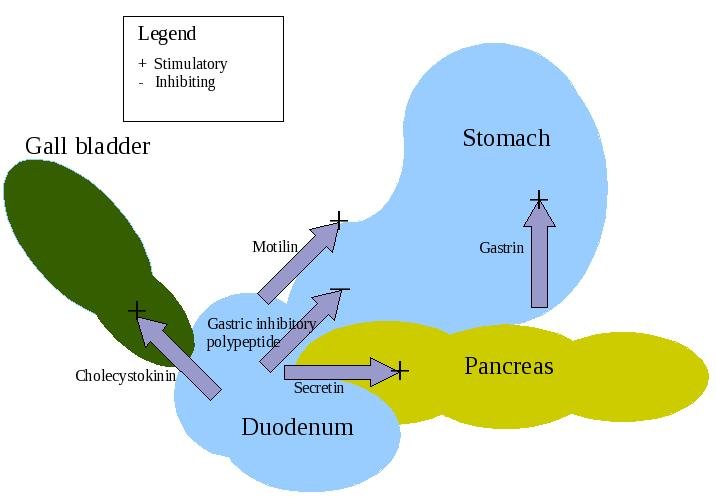
- Actions of the major digestive hormones secreted by enteroendocrine cells

Details
- System: Endocrine system
- Location: Gastrointestinal tract

Identifiers
- Latin: endocrinocyti gastroenteropancreatici
- MeSH: D019858
- TH: H3.04.02.0.00024, H3.08.01.0.00003
- FMA: 62930

Enteroendocrine cells are specialized cells of the gastrointestinal tract and pancreas with endocrine function. They produce gastrointestinal hormones or peptides in response to various stimuli and release them into the bloodstream for systemic effect, diffuse them as local messengers, or transmit them to the enteric nervous system to activate nervous responses. Enteroendocrine cells of the intestine are the most numerous endocrine cells of the body. They constitute an enteric endocrine system as a subset of the endocrine system just as the enteric nervous system is a subset of the nervous system. In a sense they are known to act as chemoreceptors, initiating digestive actions and detecting harmful substances and initiating protective responses. Enteroendocrine cells are located in the stomach, in the intestine and in the pancreas. Microbiota play key roles in the intestinal immune and metabolic responses in these enteroendocrine cells via their fermentation product (short chain fatty acid), acetate.

== Intestinal enteroendocrine cells ==
Intestinal enteroendocrine cells are not clustered together but spread as single cells throughout the intestinal tract.

Hormones secreted include somatostatin, motilin, cholecystokinin, neurotensin, vasoactive intestinal peptide, and enteroglucagon. The enteroendocrine cells sense the metabolites from intestinal commensal microbiota and, in turn, coordinate antibacterial, mechanical, and metabolic branches of the host intestinal innate immune response to the commensal microbiota.

=== K cell ===
K cells secrete gastric inhibitory peptide (GIP), an incretin, which also promotes triglyceride storage. K cells are mostly found in the duodenum.

=== L cell ===
Also called neuropod cell. L cells secrete glucagon-like peptide-1 (GLP-1), an incretin, peptide YY_{3-36}, oxyntomodulin and glucagon-like peptide-2. L cells are primarily found in the ileum and large intestine (colon), but some are also found in the duodenum and jejunum.

=== I cell ===
I cells secrete cholecystokinin (CCK), and have the highest mucosal density in the duodenum with a decreasing amount throughout the small intestine. They modulate bile secretion, exocrine pancreas secretion, and satiety.

=== G cell ===
Stomach enteroendocrine cells, known as G cells release gastrin, and stimulate gastric acid secretion.

=== Enterochromaffin cell ===
Enterochromaffin cells are enteroendocrine and neuroendocrine cells with a close similarity to adrenomedullary chromaffin cells secreting serotonin.

=== Enterochromaffin-like cell ===
Enterochromaffin-like cells or ECL cells are a type of neuroendocrine cell secreting histamine.

=== N cell ===
Located in an increasing manner throughout the small intestine, with the highest levels found in the in ileum, N cells release neurotensin, and control smooth muscle contraction.

=== S cell ===
S cells secrete secretin mostly from the duodenum, but also in decreasing amounts throughout the rest of the small intestine, and stimulate exocrine pancreatic secretion.

=== D cell ===
Also called Delta cells, D cells secrete somatostatin.

=== Mo cell (or M cell) ===
- found in crypts of the small intestine, especially in the duodenum and jejunum.
- Different from the Microfold cells (M cells) that are in Peyer's patches.
- Secrete motilin

== Gastric enteroendocrine cells ==
Gastric enteroendocrine cells are found in the gastric glands, mostly at their base. The G cells secrete gastrin, post-ganglionic fibers of the vagus nerve can release gastrin-releasing peptide during parasympathetic stimulation to stimulate secretion. Enterochromaffin-like cells are enteroendocrine and neuroendocrine cells also known for their similarity to chromaffin cells secreting histamine, which stimulates G cells to secrete gastrin.

Other hormones produced include cholecystokinin, somatostatin, vasoactive intestinal peptide, substance P, alpha and gamma-endorphin.

== Pancreatic enteroendocrine cells ==
Pancreatic enteroendocrine cells are located in the islets of Langerhans and produce most importantly the hormones insulin and glucagon. The autonomous nervous system strongly regulates their secretion, with parasympathetic stimulation stimulating insulin secretion and inhibiting glucagon secretion and sympathetic stimulation having opposite effect.

Other hormones produced include somatostatin, pancreatic polypeptide, amylin and ghrelin.

== Clinical significance ==
Rare and slow growing carcinoid and non-carcinoid tumors develop from these cells. When a tumor arises it has the capacity to secrete large volumes of hormones.

== History ==
The very discovery of hormones occurred during studies of how the digestive system regulates its activities, as explained at Secretin § Discovery.

== Other organisms ==
In rats (Rattus rattus) the Free fatty acid receptor 2 (GPR43) is expressed both by this cell type and by mast cells of the mucosa.

== See also ==
- APUD cells
- Neuroendocrine tumors
- List of human cell types derived from the germ layers
