= Robert Zollinger =

Surgeon from the United States

Robert Zollinger MD
- Zollinger in 1961
- Born: Robert Milton Zollinger; September 4, 1903; Millersport, Ohio, U.S.
- Died: June 12, 1992 (aged 88)
- Education: Ohio State University
- Occupation: Doctor of Medicine
- Years active: 1939–1974
- Known for: Chair of the department of surgery at Ohio State University
- Spouse: Louise Kiewet (m. 1929)
- Medical career
- Profession: Professor
- Research: Zollinger–Ellison syndrome

Robert Milton Zollinger (September 4, 1903 – June 12, 1992) was an American general surgeon and professor of surgery at Ohio State University. He described Zollinger–Ellison syndrome. In 1947, he became a professor of surgery and chair of the department of surgery at Ohio State University.

== Early life ==
Zollinger was born in Millersport, Ohio, to Elmira and William Zollinger, neither of whom had completed high school. As a child, he ran a business delivering milk and vegetables from his family's farm to neighbors by pony and cart. When he enrolled at Ohio State University in 1921, he became the first graduate of his high school to attend university. He earned a B.A. in 1925 followed by an M.D. in 1927. Although he was only given a "C" grade in surgery, he said he would return to Ohio State one day as the head of surgery.

== Career ==
Zollinger was granted a surgical internship at Peter Bent Brigham Hospital in Boston by the prominent surgeon Harvey Cushing, who suggested that Zollinger spend six months volunteering with the surgeon Elliott Cutler at the Case Western Reserve University School of Medicine prior to starting his internship, which he did. After his internship, he returned to begin a surgical residency with Cutler. When Cutler moved to Boston to take over from Cushing as a professor of surgery at Harvard Medical School, Zollinger followed him. Zollinger became an assistant professor in surgery at Harvard in 1939 and published his first textbook with Cutler, Atlas of Surgical Operations, in 1939. He joined the United States Army Medical Corps in 1941, rising to the rank of Colonel by the end of the Second World War, and received the Legion of Merit for his development of mobile units equipped to perform various surgeries.

In 1947, Zollinger returned to Ohio to take up the position of a professor of surgery and chair of the department of surgery at Ohio State University; he remained in those positions until his retirement in 1974. He and Edwin H. Ellison were the first to describe the association between peptic ulcers and pancreatic tumors, postulating that the ulcers were caused by hormone-induced excess gastric acid secretion. They named the disease Zollinger–Ellison syndrome, which was later shown to be caused by excess secretion of the hormone gastrin by neuroendocrine tumors of the pancreas.

During the 1960s, Zollinger served as president of the American College of Surgeons (1961–62), chairman of the American Board of Surgery (1963), and president of the American Surgical Association (1965). He was made an honorary fellow of the Royal College of Surgeons of England in 1965 and the Royal College of Surgeons of Edinburgh in 1966.

== Personal and later life ==
Zollinger married Louise née Kiewet, a schoolteacher, in 1929. They had two children, Robert M. Zollinger and Myra Louise Waud. Zollinger had a passion for growing roses and gourds, at one point having more than 400 roses growing in his yard in Bexley, Columbus. He was president of the American Rose Society and his roses won numerous ribbons at the Ohio State Fair.

He died in 1992, aged 88, from pancreatic cancer.
