= Gastric acid =

Digestive fluid formed in the stomach

Determinants of gastric acid secretion

Gastric acid or stomach acid is the acidic component – hydrochloric acid – of gastric juice, produced by parietal cells in the gastric glands of the stomach lining. In humans, the pH is between one and three, much lower than most other animals, but is very similar to that of carrion-eating carnivores that need protection from ingesting pathogens.

With this higher acidity, gastric acid plays a key protective role against pathogens. It is also key in the digestion of proteins by activating digestive enzymes, which together break down the long chains of amino acids. Gastric acid is regulated in feedback systems to increase production when needed, such as after a meal. Other cells in the stomach produce bicarbonate, a base, to buffer the fluid, ensuring a regulated pH. These cells also produce mucus – a viscous barrier to prevent gastric acid from damaging the stomach. The pancreas further produces large amounts of bicarbonate, secreting this through the pancreatic duct to the duodenum to neutralize gastric acid passing into the digestive tract.

The secretion is a complex and relatively energetically expensive process. Parietal cells contain an extensive secretory network (called canaliculi) from which the hydrochloric acid is secreted into the lumen of the stomach. The pH level is maintained by the proton pump H^{+}/K^{+} ATPase. The parietal cell releases bicarbonate into the bloodstream in the process, which causes a temporary rise of pH in the blood, known as an alkaline tide.

The gastric juice also contains digestive enzymes produced by other cells in the gastric glands – gastric chief cells. Gastric chief cells secrete an inactivated pepsinogen. Once in the stomach lumen gastric acid activates the proenzyme to pepsin.

== Secretion ==
A typical adult human stomach will secrete about 1.5 liters of gastric juice daily. Gastric juice is the combination of gastric gland secretions including the main component of hydrochloric acid (gastric acid), gastric lipase and pepsinogen. Once in the stomach pepsinogen is changed by gastric acid to the digestive enzyme pepsin adding this enzyme to the gastric juice. In humans, the pH of gastric acid is between one and three, much lower than most other animals, but is very similar to that of carrion eating carnivores, needing extra protection from ingesting pathogens.

Gastric acid secretion is produced in several steps. Chloride and hydrogen ions are secreted separately from the cytoplasm of parietal cells and mixed in the canaliculi. This creates a negative potential of between −40 and −70 mV across the parietal cell membrane that causes potassium ions and a small number of sodium ions to diffuse from the cytoplasm into the parietal cell canaliculi. Gastric acid is then secreted along with other gland secretions into the gastric pit for release into the stomach lumen.

The enzyme carbonic anhydrase catalyses the reaction between carbon dioxide and water to form carbonic acid. This acid immediately dissociates into hydrogen and bicarbonate ions. The hydrogen ions leave the cell through H^{+}/K^{+} ATPase antiporter pumps.

At the same time, sodium ions are actively reabsorbed. This means that the majority of secreted K^{+} (potassium) and Na^{+} (sodium) ions return to the cytoplasm. In the canaliculus, secreted hydrogen and chloride ions mix and are secreted into the lumen of the oxyntic gland.

The highest concentration that gastric acid reaches in the stomach is 160 mM in the canaliculi. This is about 3 million times that of arterial blood, but almost exactly isotonic with other bodily fluids. The lowest pH of the secreted acid is 0.8, but the acid is diluted in the stomach lumen to a pH of between 1 and 3.

There is a small continuous basal secretion of gastric acid between meals of usually less than 10 mEq/hour.

There are three phases in the secretion of gastric acid which increase the secretion rate in order to digest a meal:

1. The cephalic phase: Thirty percent of the total gastric acid secretions to be produced is stimulated by anticipation of eating and the smell or taste of food. This signalling occurs from higher centres in the brain through the vagus nerve (Cranial Nerve X). It activates parietal cells to release acid and ECL cells to release histamine. The vagus nerve (CN X) also releases gastrin releasing peptide onto G cells. Finally, it also inhibits somatostatin release from D cells.
2. The gastric phase: About sixty percent of the total acid for a meal is secreted in this phase. Acid secretion is stimulated by distension of the stomach and by amino acids present in the food.
3. The intestinal phase: The remaining 10% of acid is secreted when chyme enters the small intestine, and is stimulated by small intestine distension and by amino acids. The duodenal cells release entero-oxyntin which acts on parietal cells without affecting gastrin.

== Regulation of secretion ==
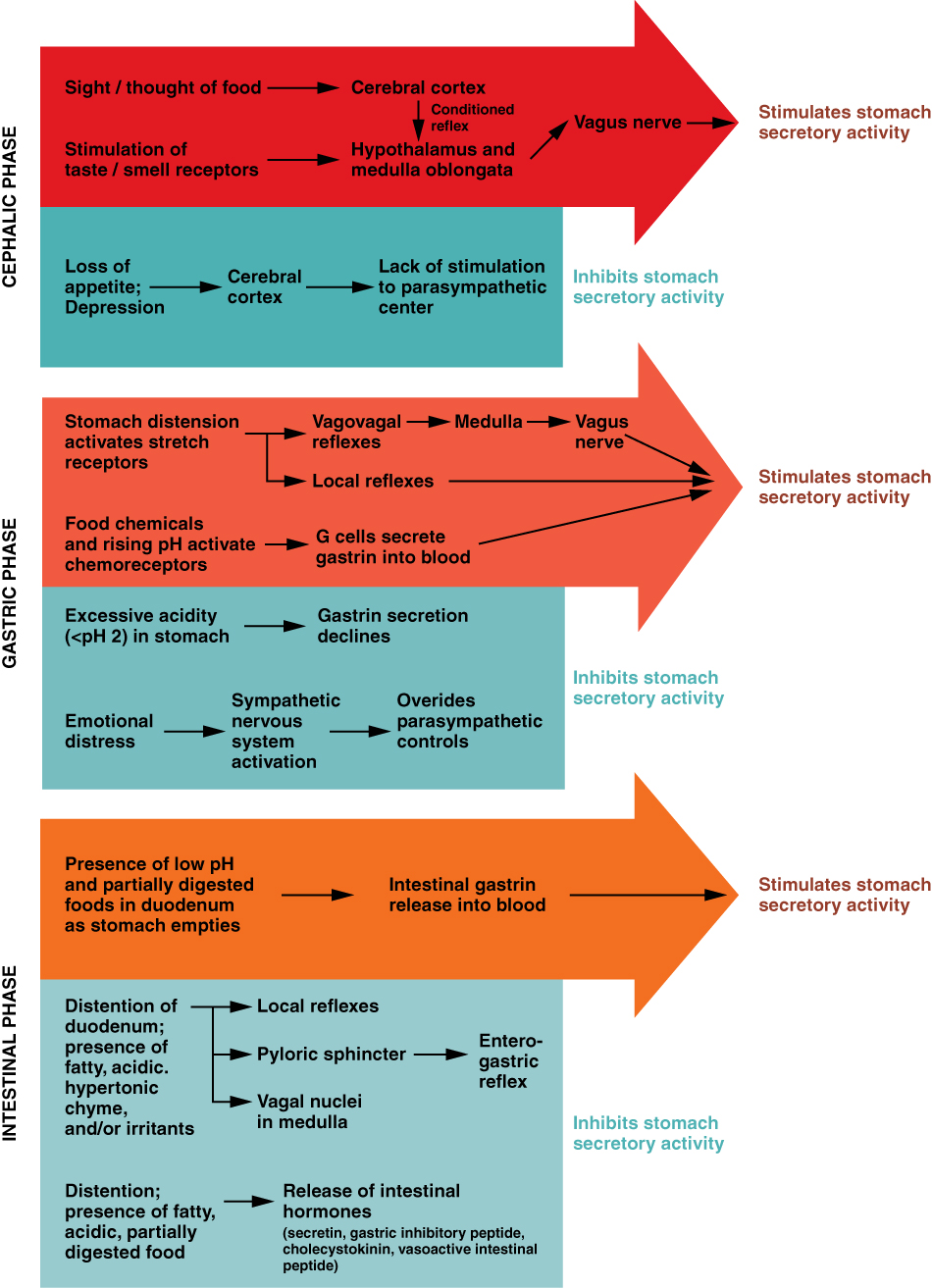
The three phases of gastric secretion

Gastric acid production is regulated by both the autonomic nervous system and several hormones. The parasympathetic nervous system, via the vagus nerve, and the hormone gastrin stimulate the parietal cell to produce gastric acid, both directly acting on parietal cells and indirectly, through the stimulation of the secretion of the hormone histamine from enterochromaffin-like cells (ECLs). Vasoactive intestinal peptide, cholecystokinin, and secretin all inhibit production.

The production of gastric acid in the stomach is tightly regulated by positive regulators and negative feedback mechanisms. Four types of cells are involved in this process: parietal cells, G cells, D cells and enterochromaffin-like cells. Beside this, the endings of the vagus nerve (CN X) and the intramural nervous plexus in the digestive tract influence the secretion significantly.

Nerve endings in the stomach secrete two stimulatory neurotransmitters: acetylcholine and gastrin-releasing peptide. Their action is both direct on parietal cells and mediated through the secretion of gastrin from G cells and histamine from enterochromaffin-like cells. Gastrin acts on parietal cells directly and indirectly too, by stimulating the release of histamine.

The release of histamine is the most important positive regulation mechanism of the secretion of gastric acid in the stomach. Its release is stimulated by gastrin and acetylcholine and inhibited by somatostatin.

== Neutralization ==
In the duodenum, gastric acid is neutralized by sodium bicarbonate. This also blocks gastric enzymes that function optimally in the acid range of pH. The secretion of bicarbonate from the pancreas is stimulated by secretin. This polypeptide hormone gets activated and secreted from so-called S cells in the mucosa of the duodenum and jejunum when the pH in the duodenum falls below 4.5 to 5.0. The neutralization is described by the equation:

HCl + NaHCO_{3} → NaCl + H_{2}CO_{3}

The carbonic acid rapidly equilibrates with carbon dioxide and water through catalysis by carbonic anhydrase enzymes bound to the gut epithelial lining, leading to a net release of carbon dioxide gas within the lumen associated with neutralisation. In the absorptive upper intestine, such as the duodenum, both the dissolved carbon dioxide and carbonic acid will tend to equilibrate with the blood, leading to most of the gas produced on neutralisation being exhaled through the lungs.

== Clinical significance ==
Gastroesophageal reflux disease (GERD) is a common disorder that occurs when stomach acid repeatedly flows back into the esophagus, this backwash of acid (reflux) also known as heartburn can irritate the lining of the esophagus. Most people are able to manage the discomfort of GERD with lifestyle changes and medications, notably proton pump inhibitors, and H2 blockers. Antacids may also be used to neutralise gastric acid. Sometimes, surgery may be needed to ease symptoms.

Chronic inflammation of the gastric mucosa can lead to atrophic gastritis resulting in a decreased secretion of gastric acid, and consequent digestive problems.

In hypochlorhydria and achlorhydria, gastric acid is either low or absent, respectively. This can potentially lead to less protection against ingested pathogens such as Vibrio or Helicobacter bacteria.

In Zollinger–Ellison syndrome gastrin levels are increased, leading to excess gastric acid production, which can cause gastric ulcers. Hypercalcemia also increases gastrin and gastric acid and can cause ulcers.

In diseases featuring excess vomiting, hypochloremic metabolic alkalosis (decreased blood acidity by H^{+} and chlorine depletion) may develop.

== History ==
The role of gastric acid in digestion was established in the 1820s and 1830s by William Beaumont on Alexis St. Martin, who, as a result of an accident, had a fistula (hole) in his stomach, which allowed Beaumont to observe the process of digestion and to extract gastric acid, verifying that acid played a crucial role in digestion.

== See also ==
- Discovery and development of proton pump inhibitors
