= G34 =

G34 may refer to:

- Socket G34, a CPU socket designed by AMD to support AMD's multi-chip module Opteron 6000-series server processors
- G-34, a form of gastrin
- Grumman G-34, a prototype of a twin-engine shipboard fighter interceptor
