= Minigastrin =

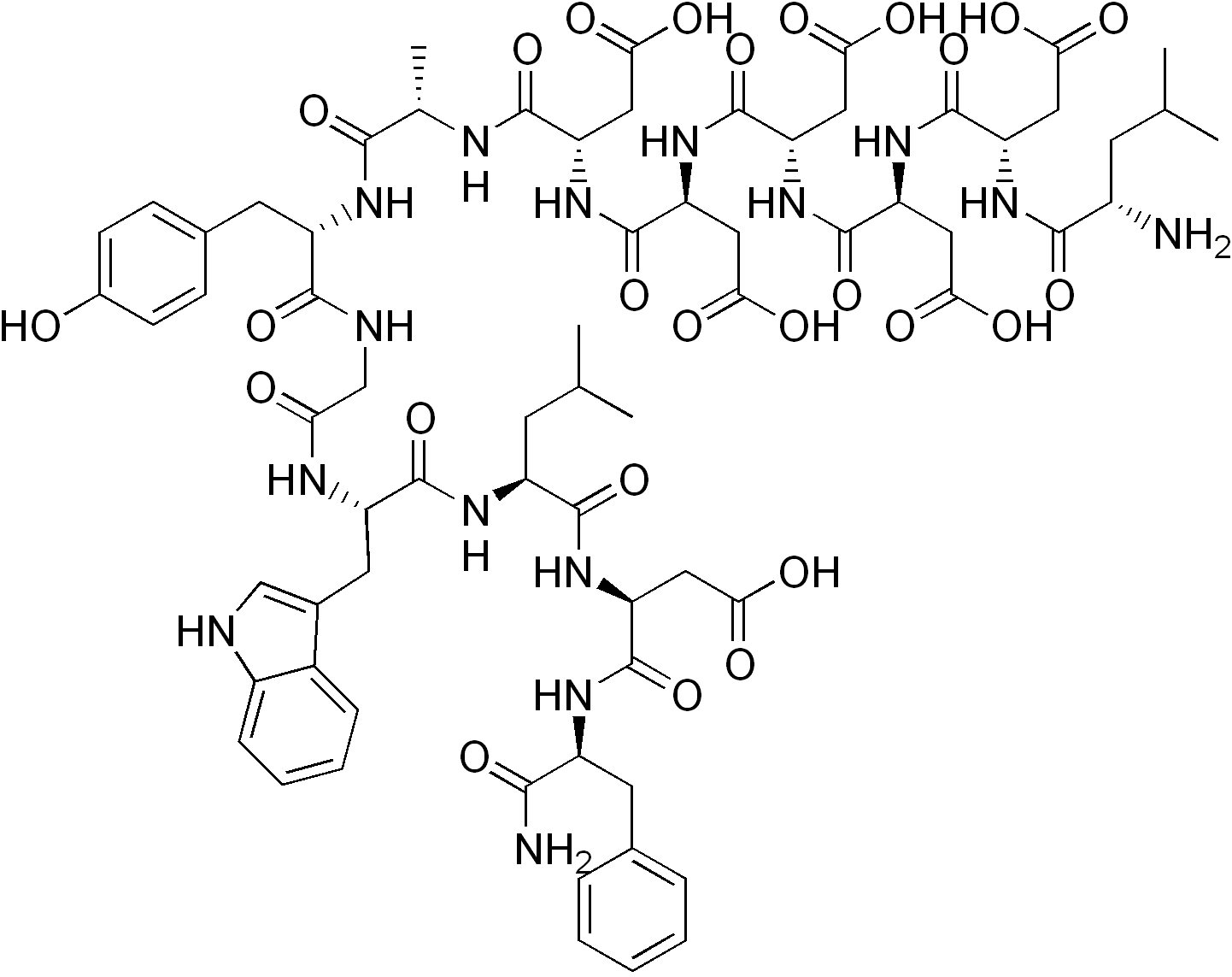

Identifiers
CAS Number	101212-63-9
3D model (JSmol)	Interactive image
ChemSpider	17287721
PubChem CID	16131008
UNII	262J9O2552
CompTox Dashboard (EPA)	DTXSID00143789
- InChI: InChI=1S/C74H99N15O26S/c1-37(2)30-44(75)65(106)81-47(19-24-58(94)95)68(109)83-49(21-26-60(98)99)70(111)85-50(22-27-61(100)101)71(112)84-48(20-25-59(96)97)69(110)82-46(18-23-57(92)93)67(108)79-38(3)64(105)88-53(32-40-14-16-42(90)17-15-40)66(107)78-36-56(91)80-54(33-41-35-77-45-13-9-8-12-43(41)45)73(114)86-51(28-29-116-4)72(113)89-55(34-62(102)103)74(115)87-52(63(76)104)31-39-10-6-5-7-11-39/h5-17,35,37-38,44,46-55,77,90H,18-34,36,75H2,1-4H3,(H2,76,104)(H,78,107)(H,79,108)(H,80,91)(H,81,106)(H,82,110)(H,83,109)(H,84,112)(H,85,111)(H,86,114)(H,87,115)(H,88,105)(H,89,113)(H,92,93)(H,94,95)(H,96,97)(H,98,99)(H,100,101)(H,102,103)/t38-,44-,46-,47-,48-,49-,50-,51-,52-,53-,54-,55-/m0/s1 Key: HRSUIUNCTPSRLR-SOLHVGTRSA-N
- SMILES: C[C@@H](C(=O)N[C@@H](Cc1ccc(cc1)O)C(=O)NCC(=O)N[C@@H](Cc2c[nH]c3c2cccc3)C(=O)N[C@@H](CCSC)C(=O)N[C@@H](CC(=O)O)C(=O)N[C@@H](Cc4ccccc4)C(=O)N)NC(=O)[C@H](CCC(=O)O)NC(=O)[C@H](CCC(=O)O)NC(=O)[C@H](CCC(=O)O)NC(=O)[C@H](CCC(=O)O)NC(=O)[C@H](CCC(=O)O)NC(=O)[C@H](CC(C)C)N

Properties
Chemical formula	C_{70}H_{91}N_{15}O_{26}
Molar mass	1558.56 g/mol
- Except where otherwise noted, data are given for materials in their standard state (at 25 °C [77 °F], 100 kPa). verify (what is ?) Infobox references

Minigastrin (also mini gastrin) is a form of gastrin. Its sequence is H-Leu-Glu-Glu-Glu-Glu-Glu-Ala-Tyr-Gly-Trp-Met-Asp-Phe-NH_{2}.

Minigastrin is a potential therapeutic agent for thyroid carcinoma by targeting cancer-promoting cholecystokinin receptors.

== Applications ==
Peptide Receptor Radionuclide Therapy (PRRT)

A radioactively labeled analogue of minigastrin, PP-F11, conjugated with NOTA, DOTA, or NODAGA, was studied to view the effects they have on peptide receptor radionuclide therapy (PRRT) and cancer cell tracing. When mice with CCK2 tumors were injected with 64Cu-labeled DOTA-PP-F11, NOTA-PP-F11, and NODAGA-PP-F11, the mice labeled with NOTA displayed a tumor uptake of 7.20 ± 0.44% ID/g and a high tumor-to-blood ratio. Further studies are being investigated on how to reduce the background levels to obtain clearer images.

The inhibition of rapamycin complex 1 improves the tumor uptake of radioactively labeled minigastrin. Treatment of A431/CCKBR tumor cells were assessed with DOTA-PP-F11N. This treatment in combination with everolimus in mice, resulted in an average size tumor reduction of about 0.3 cm³ in comparison to the control group which had an average tumor size of 0.97 cm³. The treatment group also had a higher survival rate where the control group median life span was 19.5 days and the group that received treatment had an average life span of 43 days.
