= Entero-oxyntin =

Hormone which stimulates gastric acid secretion in the stomach of animals

Entero-oxyntin is a hormone released from intestinal endocrine cells which stimulates gastric acid secretion in the stomach. It has been isolated from animals and is hypothesised to exist in humans.
