= Atrophic gastritis =

Chronic inflammation and degradation of the stomach lining

- Other names: Type A gastritis
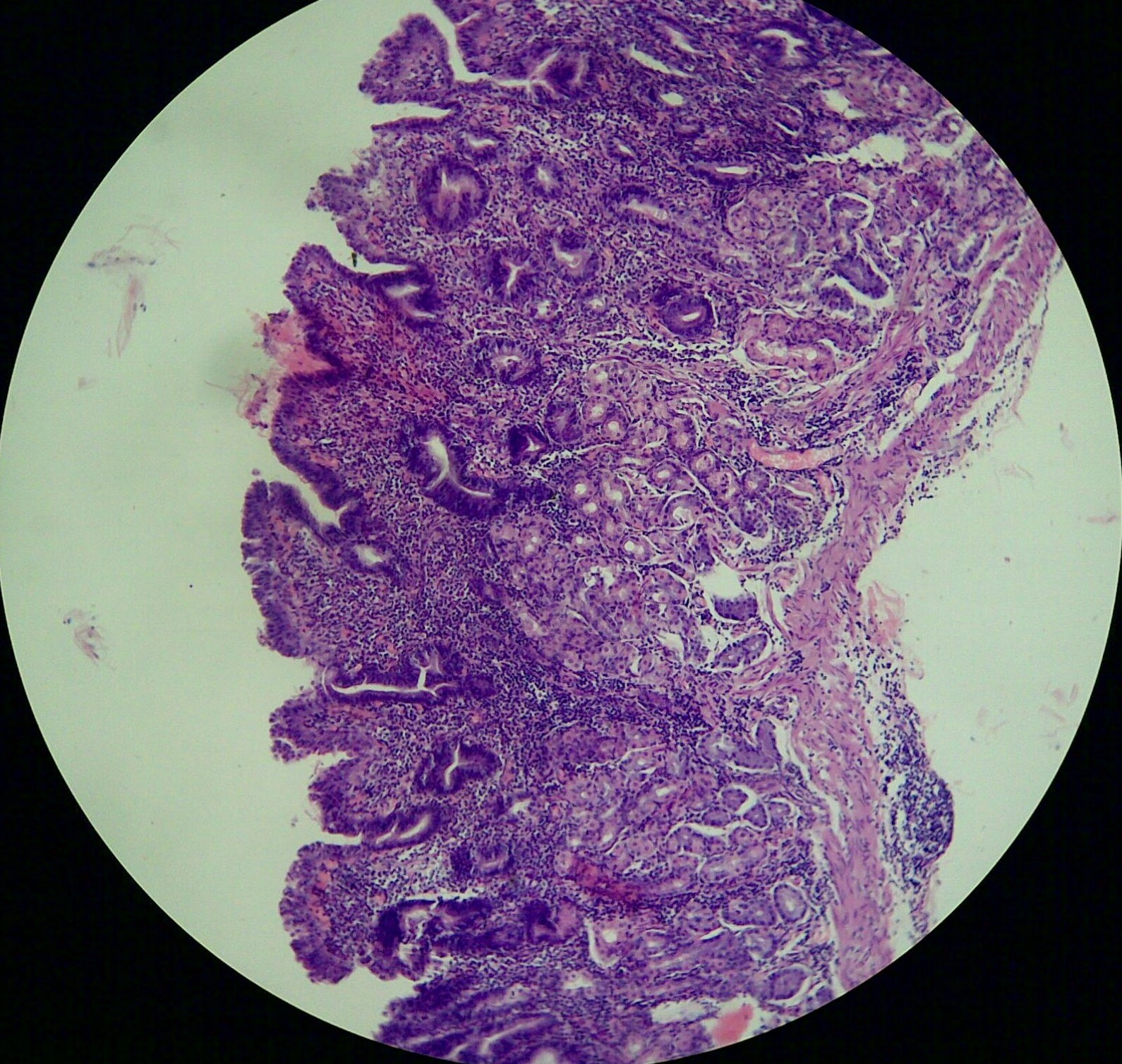
- Atrophic gastritis
- Specialty: Gastroenterology

Atrophic gastritis is a process of chronic inflammation of the gastric mucosa of the stomach, leading to a loss of gastric glandular cells and their eventual replacement by intestinal and fibrous tissues. As a result, the stomach's secretion of essential substances such as hydrochloric acid, pepsin, and intrinsic factor is impaired, leading to digestive problems. The most common are pernicious anemia possibly leading to vitamin B_{12} deficiency; and malabsorption of iron, leading to iron deficiency anaemia. It can be caused by persistent infection with Helicobacter pylori, or can be autoimmune in origin. Those with autoimmune atrophic gastritis (Type A gastritis) are statistically more likely to develop gastric carcinoma (a form of stomach cancer), Hashimoto's thyroiditis, and achlorhydria.

Type A gastritis primarily affects the fundus (body) of the stomach and is more common with pernicious anemia. Type B gastritis primarily affects the antrum, and is more common with H. pylori infection.

== Signs and symptoms ==
Some people with atrophic gastritis may be asymptomatic. Symptomatic patients are mostly females, and signs of atrophic gastritis are those associated with iron deficiency: fatigue, restless legs syndrome, brittle nails, hair loss, impaired immune function, and impaired wound healing. And other symptoms, such as delayed gastric emptying (80%), reflux symptoms (25%), peripheral neuropathy (25% of cases), autonomic abnormalities, and memory loss, are less common and occur in 1%–2% of cases. Psychiatric disorders are also reported, such as mania, depression, obsessive-compulsive disorder, psychosis, and cognitive impairment.

Although autoimmune atrophic gastritis impairs iron and vitamin B_{12} absorption, iron deficiency is detected at a younger age than pernicious anemia.

=== Associated conditions ===
People with atrophic gastritis are also at increased risk for the development of gastric adenocarcinoma.

== Causes ==
Recent research has shown that autoimmune metaplastic atrophic gastritis (AMAG) is a result of the immune system attacking the parietal cells.

Environmental metaplastic atrophic gastritis (EMAG) is due to environmental factors, such as diet and H. pylori infection. EMAG is typically confined to the body of the stomach. Patients with EMAG are also at increased risk of gastric carcinoma.

== Pathophysiology ==
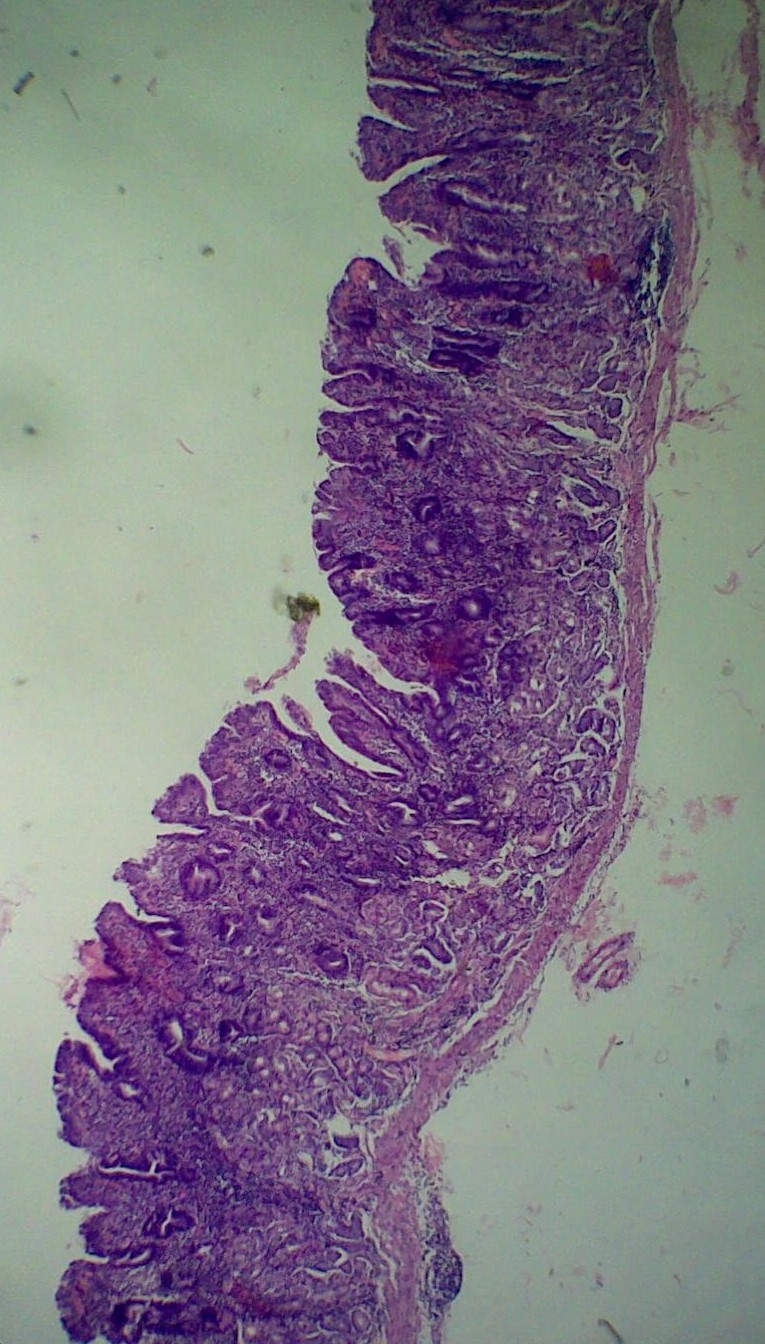
Atrophic gastritis under low power. H&E stain.

Autoimmune metaplastic atrophic gastritis (AMAG) is an inherited form of atrophic gastritis characterized by an immune response directed toward parietal cells and intrinsic factor.

Achlorhydria induces G cell (gastrin-producing) hyperplasia, which leads to hypergastrinemia. Gastrin exerts a trophic effect on enterochromaffin-like cells (ECL cells are responsible for histamine secretion) and is hypothesized to be one mechanism to explain the malignant transformation of ECL cells into carcinoid tumors in AMAG.

== Diagnosis ==
Detection of APCA (anti-parietal cell antibodies), anti-intrinsic factor antibodies (AIFA), and Helicobacter pylori (HP) antibodies in conjunction with serum gastrin are effective for diagnostic purposes.

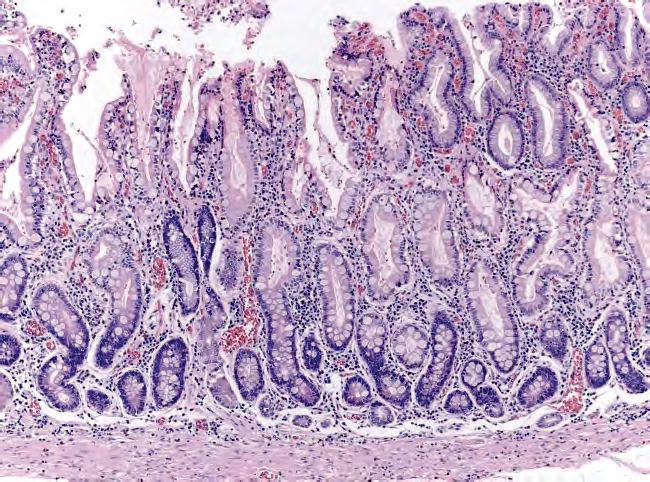
Histopathology of antral mucosa with atrophy. H&E 10×. Antral gastric mucosa with accentuated atrophy because of replacement by extensive intestinal metaplasia.

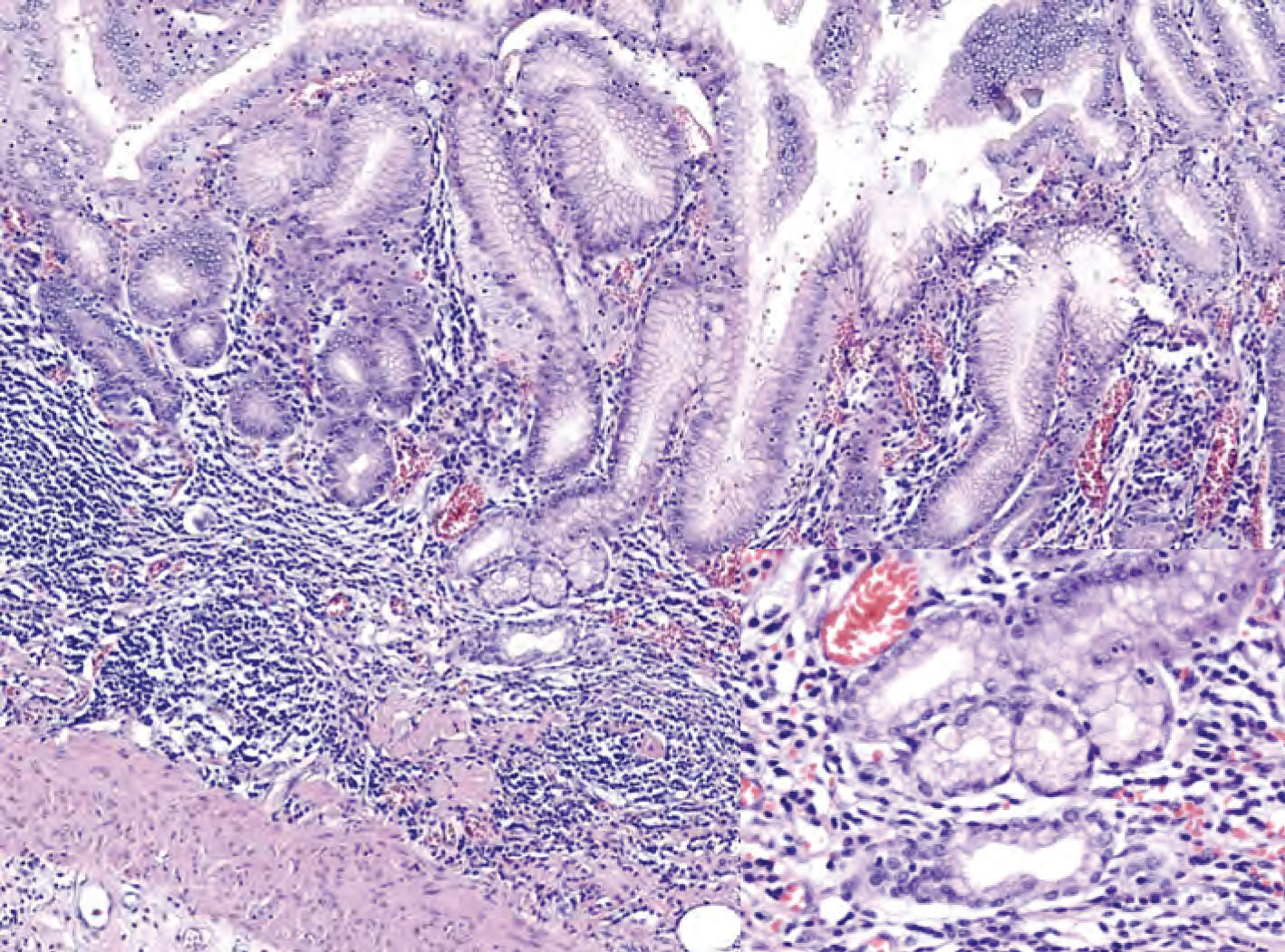
Histopathology of fundic mucosa with atrophy. H&E 10×; square 20×. Fundic-corporal gastric mucosa with extensive loss of gastric glands, partially replaced by pseudo-pyloric metaplasia.

=== Classification ===
The notion that atrophic gastritis could be classified depending on the level of progress as "closed type" or "open type" was suggested in early studies, but no universally accepted classification exists as of 2017.

== Treatment ==
Supplementation of folic acid in deficient patients can improve the histopathological findings of chronic atrophic gastritis and reduce the incidence of gastric cancer.

== See also ==
- Chronic gastritis
