= Gastrinoma =

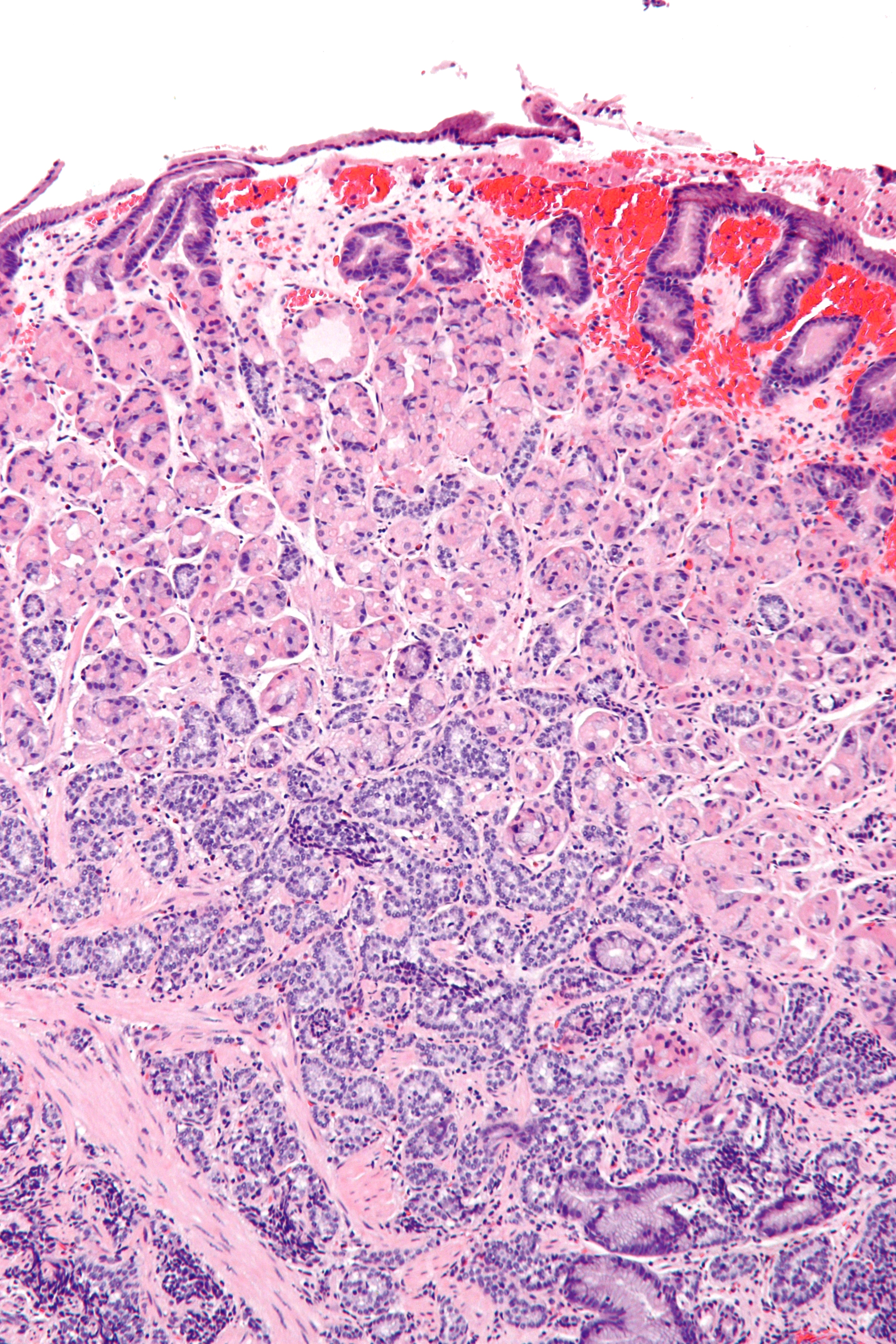
- Micrograph of a neuroendocrine tumour of the stomach. H&E stain.
- Specialty: General surgery

Gastrinomas are neuroendocrine tumors (NETs), usually located in the duodenum or pancreas, that secrete gastrin and cause a clinical syndrome known as Zollinger–Ellison syndrome (ZES). A large number of gastrinomas develop in the pancreas or duodenum, with near-equal frequency, and approximately 10% arise as primary neoplasms in lymph nodes of the pancreaticoduodenal region (gastrinoma triangle).

Most gastrinomas are sporadic (75–80%), whereas approximately 20–25% are associated with multiple endocrine neoplasia type 1 (MEN-1). Over 50% of gastrinomas are malignant and can metastasize to regional lymph nodes and liver. One fourth of gastrinomas are related to multiple endocrine neoplasia type 1, Zollinger–Ellison syndrome, peptic ulcer disease.

== Signs and symptoms ==
Gastrinoma in the early stages will have signs and symptoms of indigestion or similar to irritable bowel disease (IBD) such as:

- Hypergastrinemia
- Refractory or recurrent peptic ulcers involving duodenum
- Chronic diarrhea
- Generalized cancer symptoms
- Abdominal pain
- Gastrointestinal bleeding
- Obstruction of intestine
- Weight loss/poor appetite
- Anemia (Due to vitamin B_{12} malabsorption, and bleeding)
- Hematemesis
- Gastroesophageal reflux disease
- Esophageal complications (Barrett's esophagus, esophagitis, stricture formation)
- Vomiting
- Steatorrhea

== Pathophysiology ==
Gastrin is secreted by the G cells. G cells are primarily found in the pyloric antrum but can also be found in the duodenum and the pancreas. The primary function of gastrin is to induce the release of hydrochloric acid (HCl) from the parietal cells located in the fundus of the stomach. Parietal cells are responsible for hydrochloric (HCl) secretion along with intrinsic factor that binds to vitamin B_{12} and helps with its uptake in the terminal ileum. Other functions of gastrin include stimulating the growth of gastric mucosa and gastric motility and promoting gastric emptying. These mechanisms of the gastrointestinal tract (GIT) are up-regulated by the vagus nerve of the parasympathetic nervous system (PNS), which carries out the majority of its functions by the release of neurotransmitter Acetylcholine (Ach), and to a lesser extent gastrin releasing peptide (GRP) protein. On the contrary, the functions of GIT are down-regulated by the activation sympathetic nervous system (SNS), which carries out its functions mostly via neurotransmitter epinephrine.

at eMedicine Meal consumption causes distention of the stomach, leading to stimulation of the parasympathetic vagus nerve in the gastric mucosa, which causes the release of GRP protein. In gastrinoma, GRP protein causes larger than normal amounts of gastrin secretion, which leads to hyperplasia of the parietal cells. Hyperplasia of parietal cells causes an abnormal release of HCl into the duodenum, which causes the ulcers of the duodenum. Excessive HCl production also causes hyperperistalsis, a condition marked by excessive rapidity of the passage of food through the stomach and intestine and inhibits the activity of lipase, causing severe fatty diarrhea known as steatorrhea. Evenly the long-standing hyper-secretion of gastrin stimulate proliferation of the enterochromaffin like cells (ECL). These cells are found along the side the gastric lumen of the digestive tract. They play a main role in regulation of gastric secretion and motility when stimulated by nervous system. These cells in return will undergo progressive dysplastic changes starting with hyperplasia to neoplasia throughout the gastrointestinal tract.

== Diagnosis ==
In many cases, gastrinoma is diagnosed based on the patient's history which is typically characterized by recurrent episodes of peptic ulcer disease or by severe reflux esophagitis and/or diarrhea or by acid-related symptoms which fail to respond to standard treatment regimens. To confirm the diagnosis of gastrinoma a series of blood tests must be made. One of those tests is the serum gastrin level, which is the most reliable test for patients with gastrinoma. The normal levels of gastrin are 150 pg/mL ( > 72.15 pmol/L); therefore elevated levels of > 1000 pg/mL (> 480 pmol/L) would establish the diagnosis of gastrinoma. Another test that can be conducted is the secretin stimulated test, which is useful in patients who have the sign and symptoms of gastrinoma but the gastrin levels are below < 1000 pg/mL. Usually, an Intravenous bolus consisting of secretin 2mcg/kg and is measured in 10 minute intervals up to 30 minutes total. Secretin, which is a hormone released from the duodenal S cells that induces the release of pancreatic bicarbonate (HCO_{3}) that would neutralize the acidic environment due to high gastrin levels. Therefore, if the patient's level of gastrin remains consistently high indicating gastrin release due to tumor such as gastrinoma.

Other commonly used tests to further confirm the diagnosis are

- CT scan of the abdominal area
- Somatostatin receptor scintigraphy which is used to identify the location of the tumor
- PET scan
- Endoscopic ultrasound if there are no signs of tumor metastases.

== Treatment ==
Surgery is first line treatment in gastrinomas; however it often fails to be curative.

- Proton-pump inhibitors such as omeprazole. This group of medications suppress the acid secretion.
- H_{2}-receptor antagonist similarly decrease acid secretion.
- Octreotide injections directly release somatostatin hormone that inhibits gastrin release.
- Chemotherapy.

== Prognosis ==
Patients with gastrinomas that are also known to be part of neuroendocrine neoplasms must have to deal with two factors related to this tumor. First, controlling the high amounts by using medications that inhibit gastrin levels. The second part is stabilizing the tumor progression. Gastrinomas have a rate of 60–90% that will become malignant. Patients who do not seek medical treatment such anti-ulcer medication have high rate of recurrence and death secondary to ulcer disease. The prognosis of gastrinoma depends on the level of metastases of the tumor. If patients present with hepatic metastases they might have remaining life span of one year with a five-year survival rate of 20–30%. In patients with localized tumor or localized lymph spread the survival rate of five years is 90%. Lastly, surgical resection of local tumor could lead to complete cure without recurrence in 20–25% of patients.

== Epidemiology ==
Gastrinoma is the second most common functional pancreatic neuroendocrine tumor (pNET), with a yearly incidence of approximately 0.5 to 21.5 cases per a million of people worldwide. Gastrinomas are located predominantly in the duodenum (70%) and pancreas (25%). Pancreatic gastrinomas are larger than their duodenal counterparts, may occur in any portion of the pancreas, and comprise 25% of these tumors. Gastrinomas are also the most common functional and malignant pancreatic endocrine tumors. They are characterized by gastric hypersecretion that results in peptic ulcers and diarrhea; this condition is known as Zollinger–Ellison syndrome (ZES).

== Research ==
Recently, research studies have been conducted to seek new medical advances in relation to gastrinoma and Zollinger–Ellison syndrome. The recent studies have shown improved understanding of pathogenesis of pancreatic neuroendocrine tumors, classifications of those tumors, new treatments/preventions to control the gastrin levels in the gastrointestinal tract, and the best and safest surgical approaches. The study concluded that the wide use of proton pump inhibitors itself might further induce hypergastrinemia (increased gastrin levels in circulatory system) by feedback inhibition. The body will try to induce further release when gastrin level is depleted. Some of the new treatments might include medication that is directed towards the liver such as embolization, chemoembolization, and radioembolization in addition to the currently offered treatments such as chemotherapy, somatostatin analogs. Other treatments that are still in phase three of clinical trials include liver transplantation and peptide-radioreceptor therapy.

== See also ==
- Pancreatic endocrine tumor
