= Passaro's triangle =

Passaro's triangle or gastrinoma triangle is a presumptive region in the abdomen between three points:

1. Superior—porta hepatis (earlier—confluence of the cystic and common bile duct),
2. Inferior—junction of the second and third portion of duodenum, and
3. Medial—junction of the neck and body of the pancreas

The importance of the triangle is because it is known as the source of origin of most gastrinomas. However, primary gastrinomas can also occur in the liver or extrahepatic bile ducts, commonly with metastasis to the local lymph nodes.

The appellation is due to Edward Peter Passaro, an American surgeon, who explained it for the first time in the year 1984.
