= Delta cell =

Somatostatin-producing cell

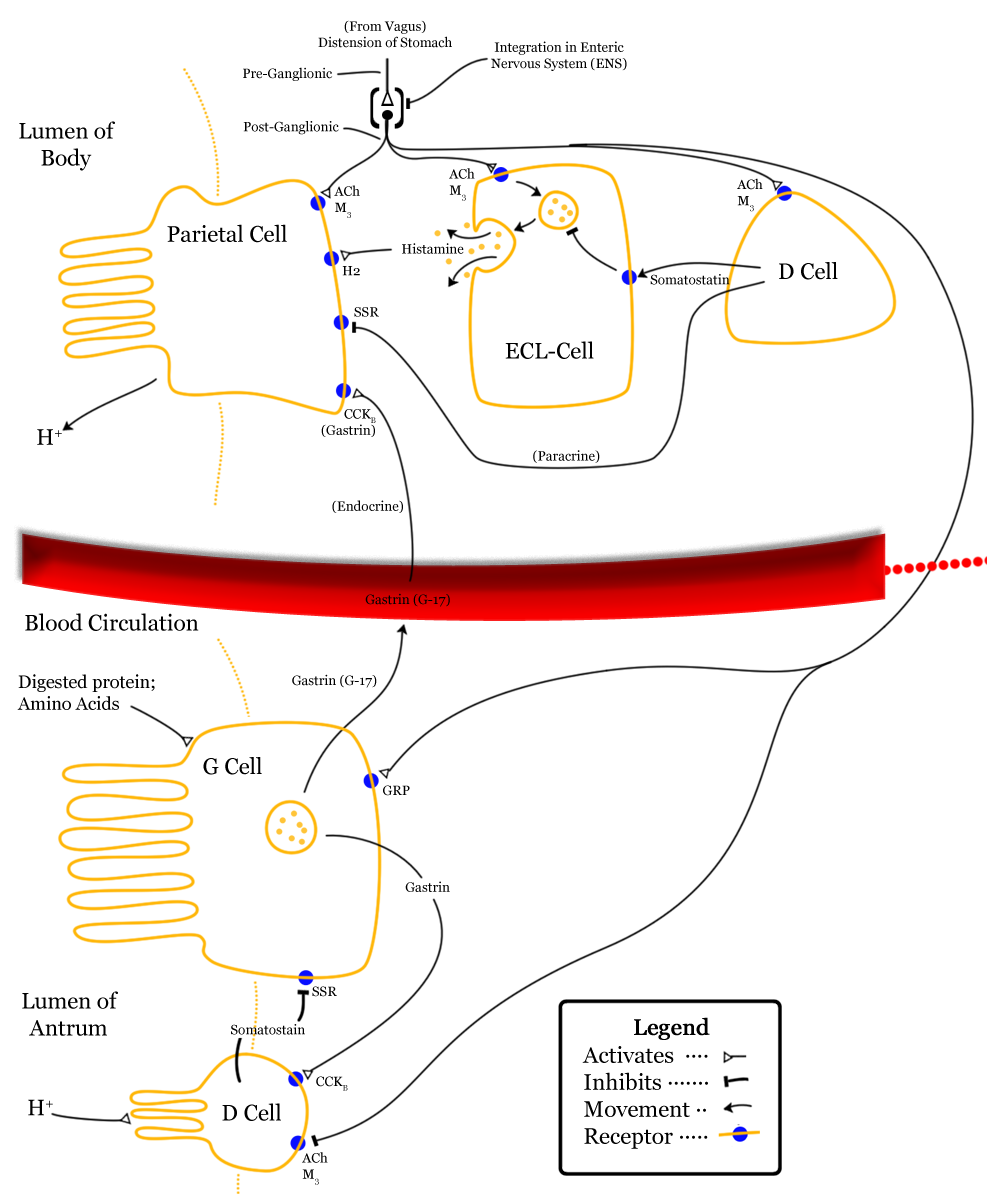
- Control of stomach acid

Details
- Location: Stomach, intestine and the pancreatic islets
- Function: Somatostatin production

Identifiers
- Latin: endocrinocytus D
- TH: H3.04.02.0.00027
- FMA: 62935

Delta cells (δ-cells or D cells) are somatostatin-producing cells. They can be found in the stomach, intestine and the pancreatic islets. Delta cells comprise ca 5% of the cells in the islets but may interact with many more islet cells than suggested by their low numbers. In rodents, delta-cells are located in the periphery of the islets; in humans the islet architecture is generally less organized and delta-cells are frequently observed inside the islets as well. In both species, the peptide hormone Urocortin III (Ucn3) is a major local signal that is released from beta cells (and alpha cells in primates) to induce the local secretion of somatostatin. It has also been suggested that somatostatin may be implicated in insulin-induced hypoglycaemia through a mechanism involving SGLT-2 receptors. Ghrelin can also strongly stimulate somatostatin secretion, thus indirectly inhibiting insulin release. Viewed under an electron microscope, delta-cells can be identified as cells with smaller and slightly more compact granules than beta cells.

The δ-cells in the stomach contain CCKBR (which respond to gastrin) and M3 receptors (which respond to Ach). Respectively, these receptors will increase somatostatin output and decrease somatostatin output from the δ-cells. VIP, vasoactive intestinal peptide, acts positively on δ-cells resulting in more somatostatin being released.

In the stomach, somatostatin acts directly on the acid-producing parietal cells via a G-protein coupled receptor (which inhibits adenylate cyclase, thus effectively antagonising the stimulatory effect of histamine) to reduce acid secretion. Somatostatin can also indirectly decrease stomach acid production by preventing the release of other hormones, including gastrin, secretin and histamine which effectively slows down the digestive process.

== Clinical significance ==
A tumor of the delta cells is called a "somatostatinoma".

When a person is infected with H. pylori the lower region of the stomach, the antrum, is predominantly inflamed. This is where most of the δ-cells in the stomach are. The bacteria produce a cloud of ammonia around themselves using urease to protect them from the stomach acid; however, this reacts with the acid producing ammonium which is toxic to cells. This leads to many of the δ-cells dying, an effect that is further compounded by the low PD-L1 expression on the δ-cells as compared to gastric G cells (resulting in higher susceptibility of δ-cells to inflammatory responses). In turn, this results in a lower level of somatostatin being secreted and consequently higher release of gastrin and stomach acid. This, combined with the damage from ammonium, leads to ulceration of the stomach wall.

== See also ==
- List of human cell types derived from the germ layers
- List of distinct cell types in the adult human body
