= Pylorus =

Part of the stomach that connects to the duodenum

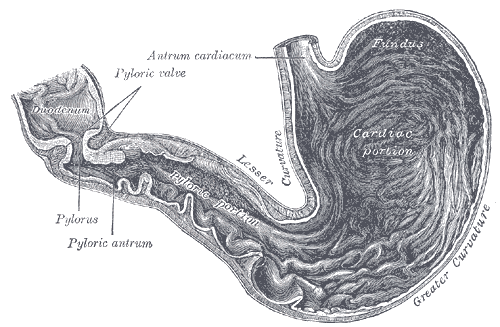
- Inside of the stomach (pylorus labeled at center left)

Details
- Synonym: Pyloric region, pyloric part

Identifiers
- Latin: pylorus
- Greek: πυλωρός
- MeSH: D011708
- TA98: A05.5.01.017
- TA2: 2930
- FMA: 14581

The pylorus (/paɪˈlɔːrəs/ or /pɪˈloʊrəs/) connects the stomach to the duodenum. The pylorus is considered as having two parts, the pyloric antrum (opening to the body of the stomach) and the pyloric canal (opening to the duodenum). The pyloric canal ends as the pyloric orifice, which marks the junction between the stomach and the duodenum. The orifice is surrounded by a sphincter, a band of muscle, called the pyloric sphincter. The word pylorus comes from Greek πυλωρός, via Latin. The word pylorus in Greek means "gatekeeper", related to "gate" (Greek: pyle) and is thus linguistically related to the word "pylon".

== Structure ==
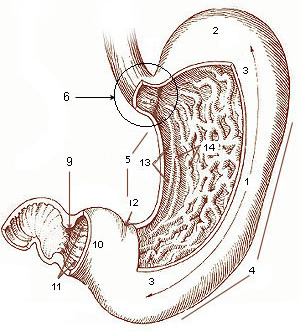
Diagram from cancer.gov: 1. Body of stomach; 2. Fundus; 3. Anterior wall; 4. Greater curvature; 5. Lesser curvature; 6. Cardia; 9. Pyloric sphincter; 10. Pyloric antrum; 11. Pyloric canal; 12. Angular incisure; 13. Gastric canal; 14. Rugal folds

The pylorus is the furthest part of the stomach that connects to the duodenum. It is divided into two parts, the antrum, which connects to the body of the stomach, and the pyloric canal, which connects to the duodenum.

=== Antrum ===
The antrum also called the gastric antrum or the pyloric antrum is the initial portion of the pyloric region. It is near the bottom of the stomach, proximal to the pyloric sphincter, which separates the stomach and the duodenum. It may temporarily become partially or completely shut off from the remainder of the stomach during digestion by peristaltic contraction of the prepyloric sphincter; it is demarcated, sometimes, from the pyloric canal by a slight groove.

=== Canal ===
The pyloric canal (Latin: canalis pyloricus) is the opening between the stomach and the duodenum. The wall thickness of the pyloric canal is up to 3 millimeters (mm) in infants younger than 30 days, and up to 8 mm in adults.

=== Sphincter ===
The pyloric sphincter, surrounding the pyloric orifice is a strong ring of smooth muscle at the end of the pyloric canal which lets food pass from the stomach to the duodenum. It acts as a valve, controlling the outflow of gastric contents into the duodenum and release of chyme. Its function is modulated by both the central and enteric nervous systems. It receives sympathetic innervation from the celiac ganglion.

=== Histology ===
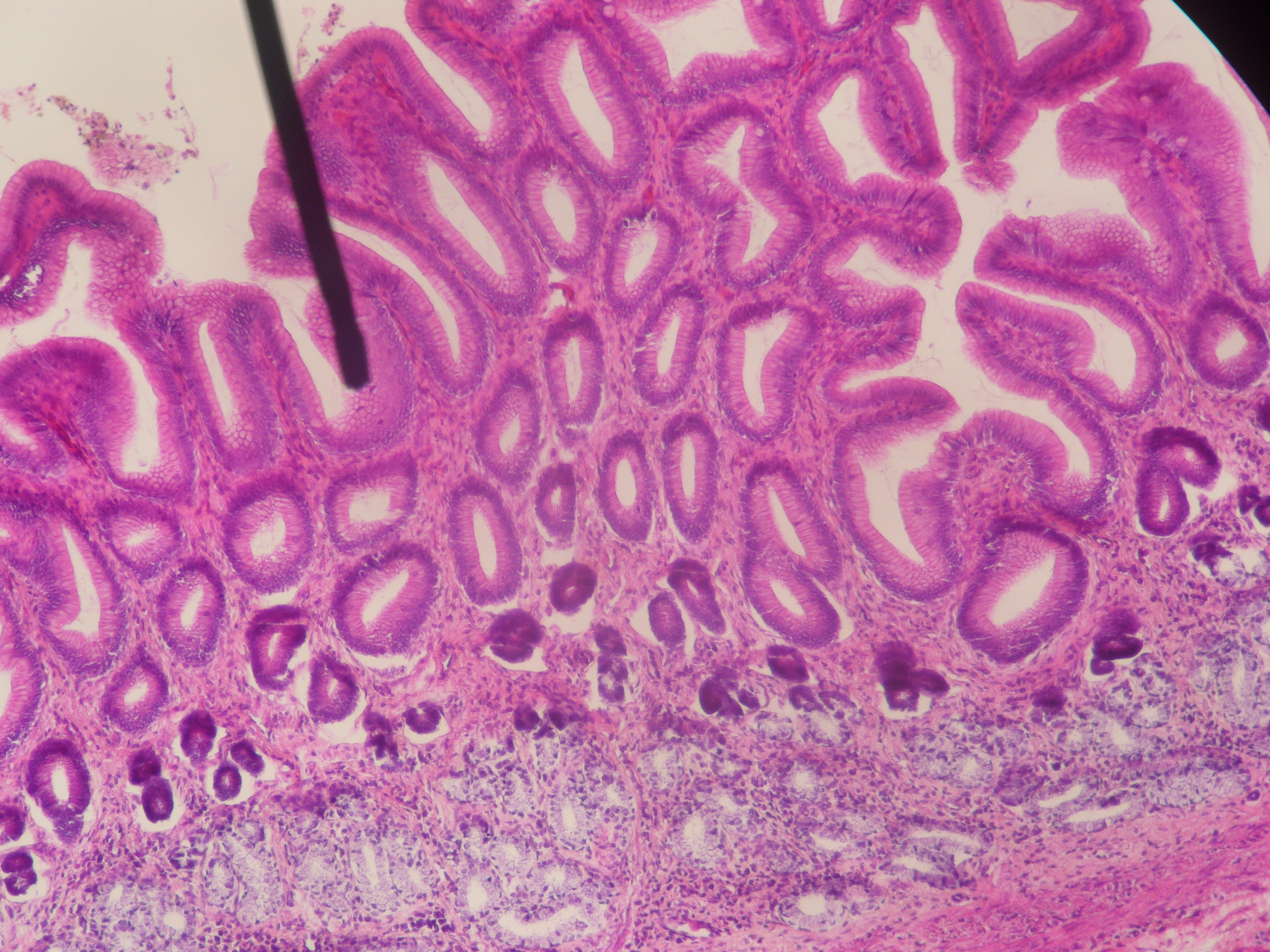
Microscopic cross-section of the pylorus

Under microscopy, the pylorus contains numerous glands, including gastric pits, which constitute about half the depth of the pyloric mucosa. They consist of two or three short closed tubes opening into a common duct or mouth. These tubes are wavy, and are about one-half the length of the duct. The duct is lined by columnar cells, continuous with the epithelium lining the surface of the mucous membrane of the stomach, the tubes by shorter and more cubical cell which are finely granular. The glands contain mucous cells and G cells that secrete gastrin.

The pylorus also contains scattered parietal cells and neuroendocrine cells. These endocrine cells include D cells, which release somatostatin, responsible for shutting off acid secretion. (There is a second hormone-sensitive population near the fundus.) Unstriated muscles, which are entirely involuntary, are located at the pylorus.

== Function ==
The pylorus is one component of the gastrointestinal tract. Food from the stomach, as chyme, passes through the pylorus to the duodenum. The pylorus, through the pyloric sphincter, regulates entry of food from the stomach into the duodenum.

== Clinical significance ==
In such conditions as stomach cancer, tumours may partly block the pyloric canal. A special tube can be implanted surgically to connect the stomach to the duodenum so as to facilitate the passage of food from one to the other. The surgery to place this tube is called a gastroduodenostomy.

=== Stenosis ===
Pyloric stenosis refers to a pylorus that is narrow. This is due to congenital hypertrophy of the pyloric sphincter. The lumen of the pylorus is narrower, and less food is able to pass through. This problem is often detected in the early weeks of life. When it is present, a newborn baby may projectile vomit after eating, but despite vomiting remain hungry. Pyloric stenosis may be managed by the insertion of a stent, or through surgical cutting of the pyloric sphincter, a pyloromyotomy.

=== Other ===
- Pyloric tumors
  - Pyloric gland adenoma

== Additional images ==
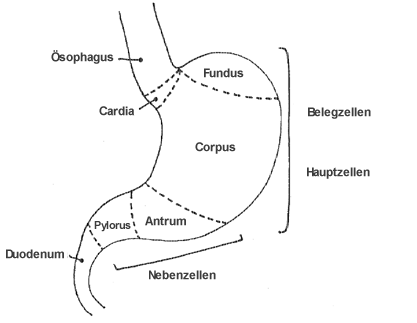
Stomach

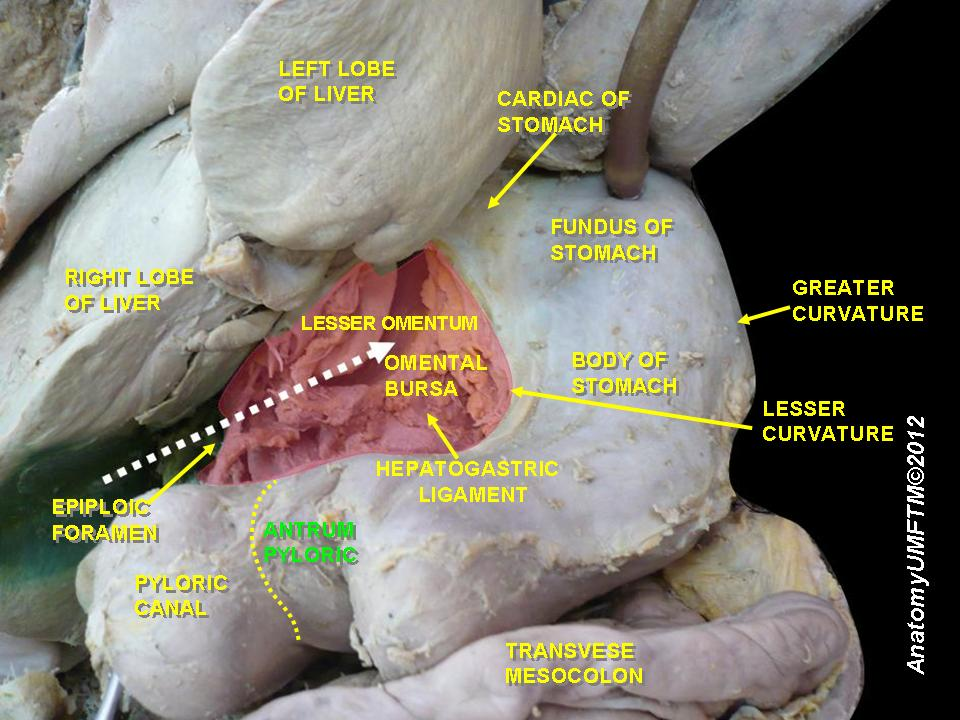
Dissection showing the stomach and pylorus in a cadaver. The antrum of the pylorus is shown in green.

== See also ==
- A Confederacy of Dunces#Ignatius J. Reilly
