= Alkaline tide =

Increase in blood pH after a meal

Alkaline tide refers to a condition, normally encountered after eating a meal, where during the production of hydrochloric acid by the parietal cells in the stomach, the parietal cells secrete bicarbonate ions across their basolateral membranes and into the blood, causing a temporary increase in blood pH.

During hydrochloric acid secretion in the stomach, the gastric parietal cells extract chloride anions, carbon dioxide, water and sodium cations from the blood plasma and in turn release bicarbonate back into the plasma after forming it from carbon dioxide and water constituents. This is to maintain the plasma's electrical balance, as the chloride anions have been extracted. The bicarbonate content causes the venous blood to leave the stomach more alkaline than the arterial blood delivered to it.

The alkaline tide is neutralised by the secretion of H^{+}into the blood during HCO_{3}^{−} secretion in the pancreas.

Postprandial (i.e., after a meal) alkaline tide lasts until the acids in food absorbed in the small intestine reunite with the bicarbonate that was produced when the food was in the stomach. Thus, the alkaline tide is self-limited and normally lasts less than two hours.

Postprandial alkaline tide has also been shown to be a causative agent of calcium oxalate urinary stones in cats, and potentially in other species.

A more pronounced alkaline tide results from vomiting, which stimulates the hyperactivity of gastric parietal cells to replace lost stomach acid. Thus, protracted vomiting can result in metabolic alkalosis.
