= G cell =

Type of cell in the stomach and duodenum that secretes gastrin

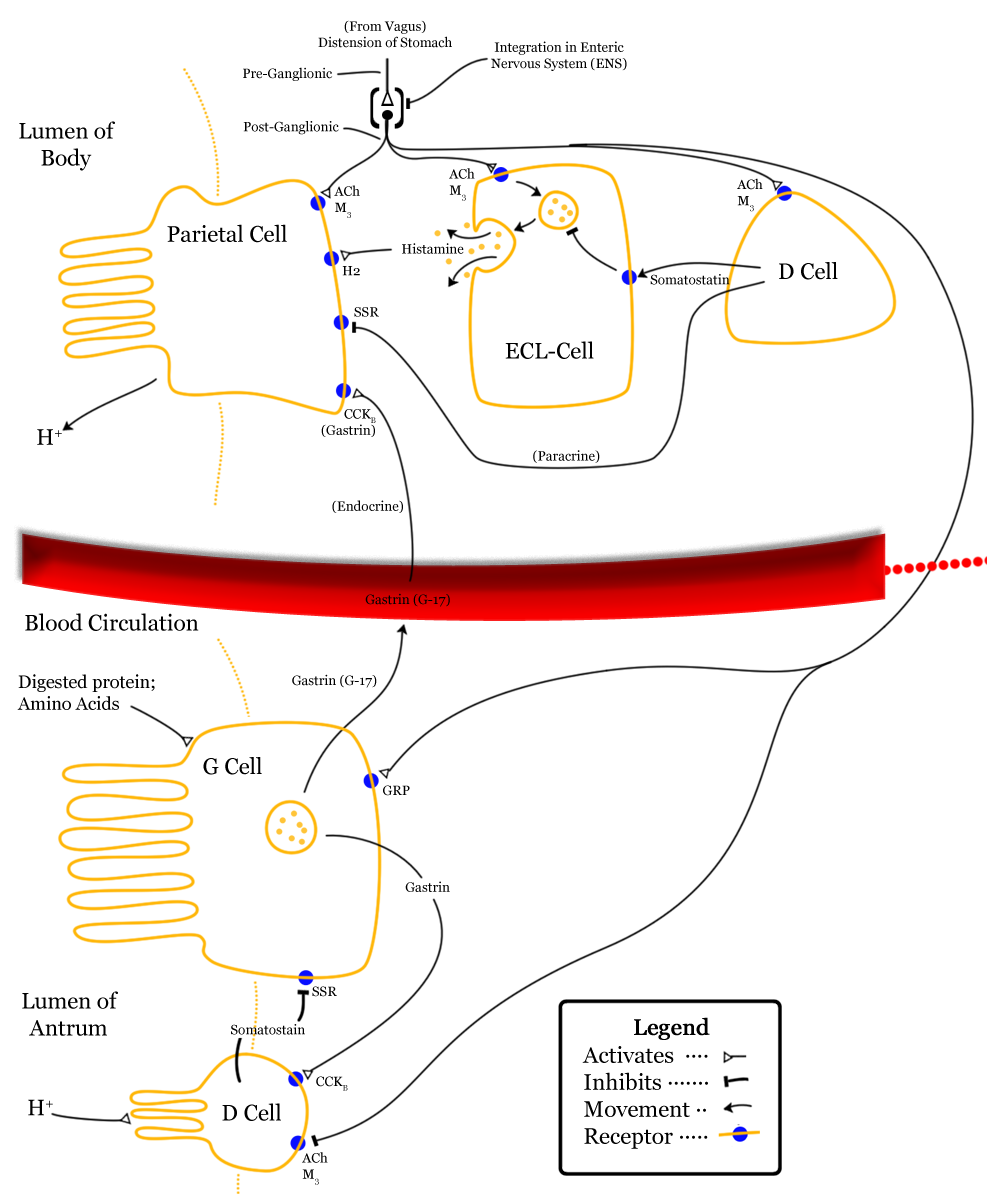
- Control of stomach acid

Details
- System: Digestive system
- Location: Stomach and duodenum
- Function: Gastrin secretion

Identifiers
- Latin: endocrinocytus G
- TH: H3.04.02.0.00031
- FMA: 67609

A G cell or gastrin cell is a type of cell in the stomach and duodenum that secretes gastrin. It works in conjunction with gastric chief cells and parietal cells. G cells are found deep within the pyloric glands of the stomach antrum, and occasionally in the pancreas and duodenum. The vagus nerve innervates the G cells. Gastrin-releasing peptide is released by the post-ganglionic fibers of the vagus nerve onto G cells during parasympathetic stimulation. The peptide hormone bombesin also stimulates gastrin from G cells. Gastrin-releasing peptide, as well as the presence of amino acids in the stomach, stimulates the release of gastrin from the G cells. Gastrin stimulates enterochromaffin-like cells to secrete histamine. Gastrin also targets parietal cells by increasing the amount of histamine and the direct stimulation by gastrin, causing the parietal cells to increase HCl secretion in the stomach. G-cells frequently express PD-L1 during homeostasis which protects them from Helicobacter pylori-induced immune destruction.

== Structure ==
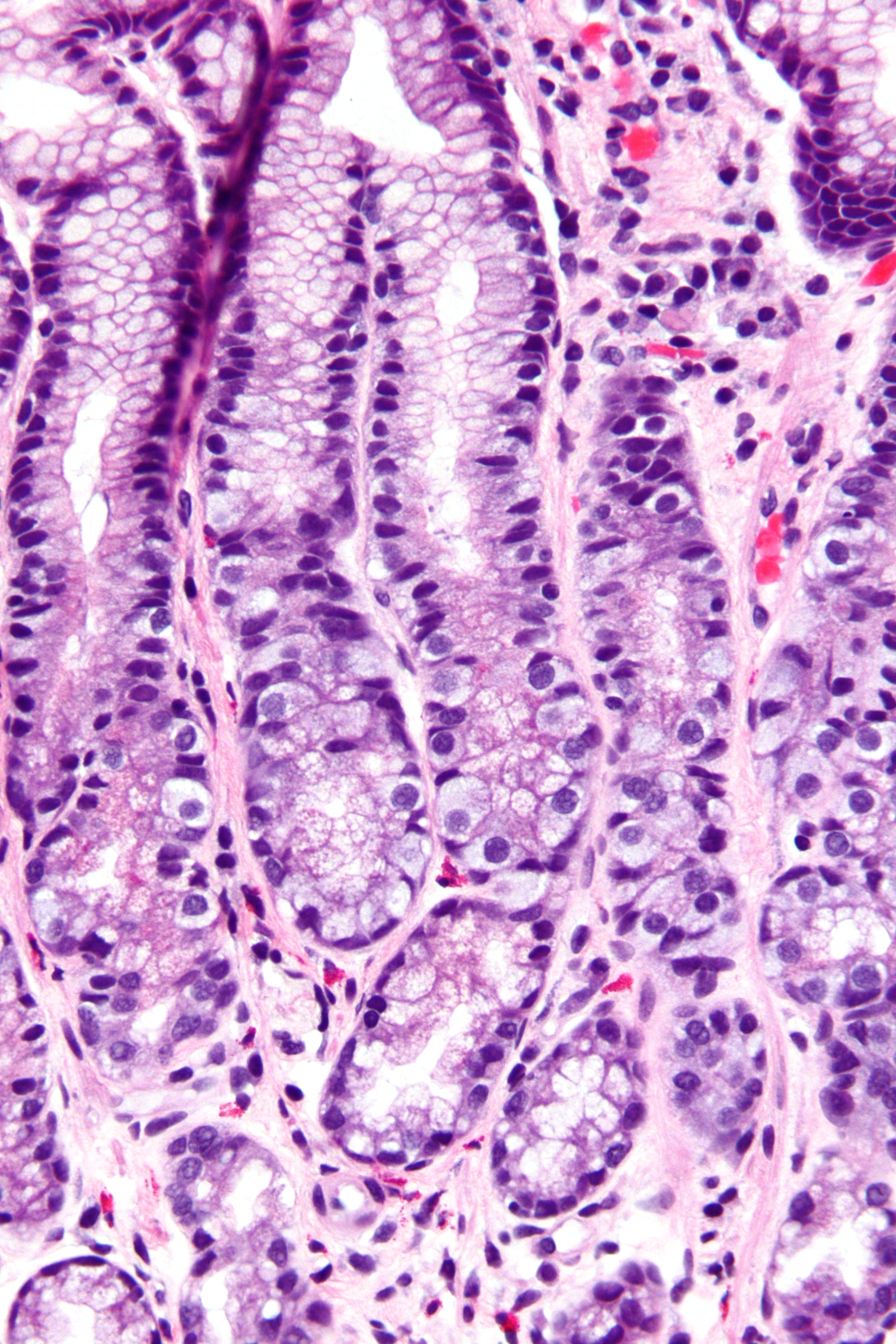
Micrograph of the gastric antrum showing abundant fried egg-like G cells. H&E stain.

G cells have a distinctive microscopic appearance that allows one to separate them from other cells in the gastric antrum; their nuclei are centrally located in the cell. They are found in the middle portion of the gastric glands.

== See also ==
- List of human cell types derived from the germ layers
