= Gastrin =

Mammalian protein found in Homo sapiens

GAST

Identifiers
- Aliases: GAST, GAS, gastrin
- External IDs: OMIM: 137250; MGI: 104768; GeneCards: GAST

Gene location (Human)
Chr.	Chromosome 17 (human)
Band	17q21.2	Start	41,712,331 bp
Band	17q21.2	End	41,715,969 bp

Gene location (Mouse)
Chr.	Chromosome 11 (mouse)
Band	11 D|11 63.46 cM	Start	100,225,233 bp
Band	11 D|11 63.46 cM	End	100,227,822 bp
RNA expression pattern
Bgee	Human / Mouse (ortholog); Top expressed in: pylorus; duodenum; pancreatic ductal cell; islet of Langerhans; placenta; metanephros; hypothalamus; upper respiratory tract; endometrium; mucosa of nose / Top expressed in: pyloric antrum; epithelium of stomach; morula; mucous cell of stomach; CA3 field; cingulate gyrus; choroid plexus of fourth ventricle; embryo; entorhinal cortex; perirhinal cortex; More reference expression data
BioGPS	n/a
Gene ontology
Molecular function	protein binding; hormone activity
Cellular component	extracellular region; extracellular space
Biological process	response to food; signal transduction; regulation of signaling receptor activity; G protein-coupled receptor signaling pathway
Sources:Amigo / QuickGO
Orthologs
Databases	NCBI: entry; OMA: entry
Species	Human	Mouse
Entrez	2520	14459
Ensembl	ENSG00000184502	ENSMUSG00000017165
UniProt	P01350	P48757
RefSeq (mRNA)	NM_000805	NM_010257
RefSeq (protein)	NP_000796	NP_034387
Location (UCSC)	Chr 17: 41.71 – 41.72 Mb	Chr 11: 100.23 – 100.23 Mb
PubMed search
- Wikidata
View/Edit Human	View/Edit Mouse

Gastrin

Identifiers
- Symbol: Gastrin
- Pfam: PF00918
- InterPro: IPR001651
- PROSITE: PDOC00232
Available protein structures:
- PDB: IPR001651 PF00918 (ECOD; PDBsum)
- AlphaFold: IPR001651; PF00918

Gastrin is a peptide hormone that stimulates secretion of gastric acid (HCl) by the parietal cells of the stomach and aids in gastric motility. It is released by G cells in the pyloric antrum of the stomach, duodenum, and the pancreas.

Gastrin binds to cholecystokinin B receptors to stimulate the release of histamines in enterochromaffin-like cells, and it induces the insertion of K^{+}/H^{+} ATPase pumps into the apical membrane of parietal cells (which in turn increases H^{+} release into the stomach cavity). Its release is stimulated by peptides in the lumen of the stomach.

== Physiology ==
=== Genetics ===
In humans, the GAS gene is located on the long arm of the seventeenth chromosome (17q21).

=== Synthesis ===
Gastrin is a linear peptide hormone produced by G cells of the duodenum and in the pyloric antrum of the stomach. It is secreted into the bloodstream. The encoded polypeptide is preprogastrin, which is cleaved by enzymes in posttranslational modification to produce progastrin (an intermediate, inactive precursor) and then gastrin in various forms, primarily the following three:

- gastrin-34 ("big gastrin")
- gastrin-17 ("little gastrin")
- gastrin-14 ("minigastrin")

Also, pentagastrin is an artificially synthesized, five amino acid sequence identical to the last five amino acid sequence at the C-terminus end of gastrin. The numbers refer to the amino acid count.

=== Release ===
Gastrin is released in response to certain stimuli. These include:

- stomach antrum distension
- vagal stimulation (mediated by the neurocrine bombesin, or GRP in humans)
- the presence of partially digested proteins, especially amino acids, in the stomach. Aromatic amino acids are particularly powerful stimuli for gastrin release.
- hypercalcemia (via calcium-sensing receptors)

Gastrin release is inhibited by:

- the presence of acid (primarily the secreted HCl) that leads to a low pH in the stomach (a case of negative feedback)
- somatostatin also inhibits the release of gastrin, along with secretin, GIP (gastroinhibitory peptide), VIP (vasoactive intestinal peptide), glucagon and calcitonin.

=== Function ===
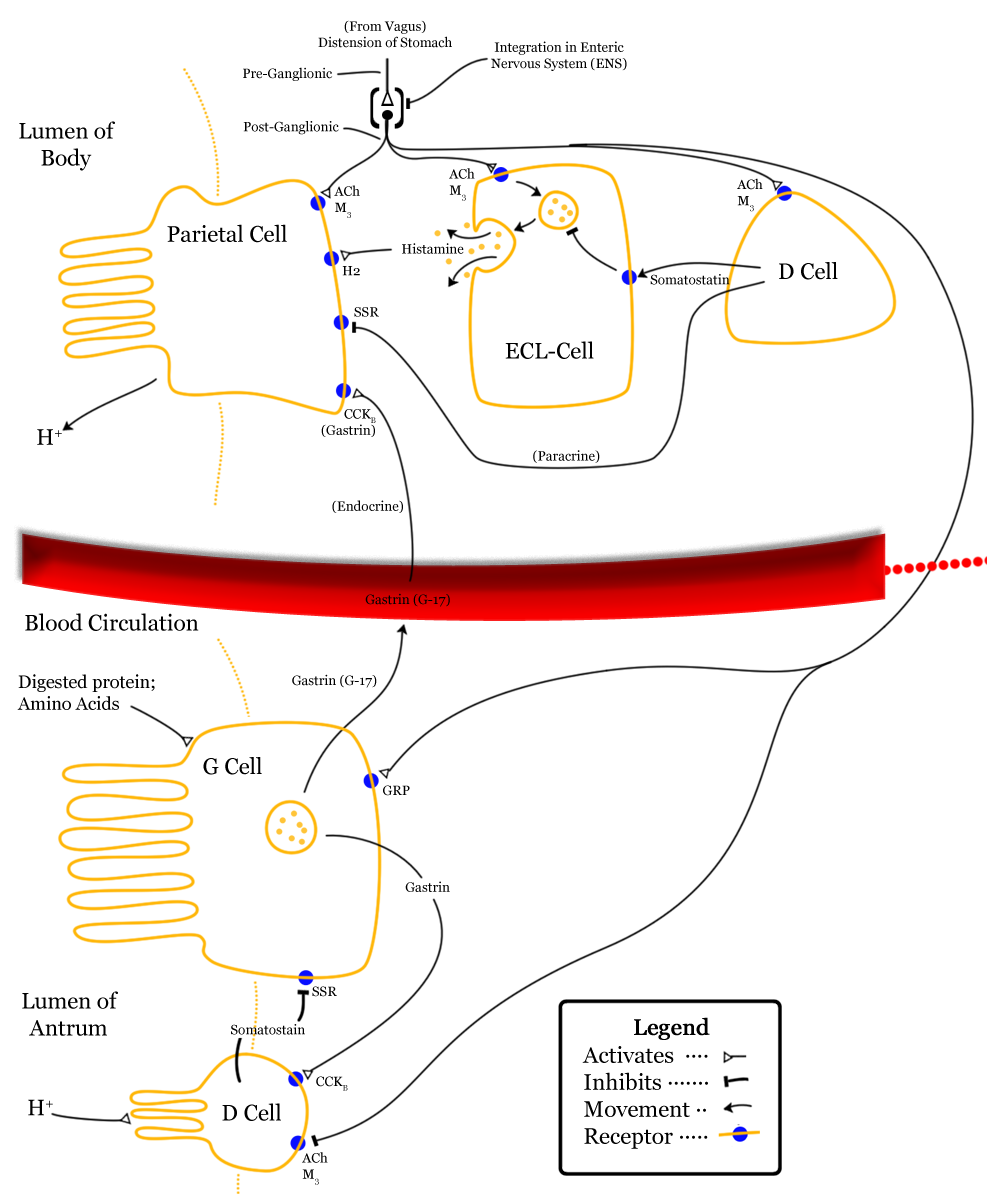
G cell is visible near bottom left, and gastrin is labeled as the two black arrows leading from it. Note: this diagram does not illustrate gastrin's stimulatory effect on ECL cells.

The presence of gastrin stimulates parietal cells of the stomach to secrete hydrochloric acid (HCl)/gastric acid. This is done both directly on the parietal cell and indirectly via binding onto CCK2/gastrin receptors on ECL cells in the stomach, which respond by releasing histamine, which in turn acts in a paracrine manner on parietal cells stimulating them to secrete H+ ions. This is the major stimulus for acid secretion by parietal cells.

Along with the above-mentioned function, gastrin has been shown to have additional functions as well:

- Stimulates parietal cell maturation and fundal growth.
- Causes chief cells to secrete pepsinogen, the zymogen (inactive) form of the digestive enzyme pepsin.
- Increases antral muscle mobility and promotes stomach contractions.
- Strengthens antral contractions against the pylorus, and relaxes the pyloric sphincter, which increases the rate of gastric emptying.
- Plays a role in the relaxation of the ileocecal valve.
- Induces pancreatic secretions and gallbladder emptying.
- May impact lower esophageal sphincter (LES) tone, causing it to contract, - although pentagastrin, rather than endogenous gastrin, may be the cause.
- Gastrin contributes to the gastrocolic reflex.

=== Factors influencing secretion ===
Factors influencing secretion of gastrin can be divided into 2 categories:

==== Physiologic ====
===== Gastric lumen =====
- Stimulatory factors: dietary protein and amino acids (meat), hypercalcemia. (i.e. during the gastric phase)
- Inhibitory factor: acidity (pH below 3) - a negative feedback mechanism, exerted via the release of somatostatin from δ cells in the stomach, which inhibits gastrin and histamine release.

===== Paracrine =====
- Stimulatory factor: bombesin or gastrin-releasing peptide (GRP)
- Inhibitory factor: somatostatin - acts on somatostatin-2 receptors on G cells. in a paracrine manner via local diffusion in the intercellular spaces, but also systemically through its release into the local mucosal blood circulation; it inhibits acid secretion by acting on parietal cells.

===== Nervous =====
- Stimulatory factors: Beta-adrenergic agents, cholinergic agents, gastrin-releasing peptide (GRP)
- Inhibitory factor: Enterogastric reflex

===== Circulation =====
- Stimulatory factor: gastrin
- Inhibitory factors:gastric inhibitory peptide (GIP), secretin, somatostatin, glucagon, calcitonin

==== Pathophysiologic ====
===== Paraneoplastic =====
- Gastrinoma paraneoplastic oversecretion (see Role in disease)

== Role in disease ==
In the Zollinger–Ellison syndrome, gastrin is produced at excessive levels, often by a gastrinoma gastrin-producing tumor, mostly benign of the duodenum or the pancreas. To investigate for hypergastrinemia high blood levels of gastrin, a "pentagastrin test" can be performed.

In autoimmune gastritis, the immune system attacks the parietal cells leading to hypochlorhydria low stomach acid secretion. This results in an elevated gastrin level in an attempt to compensate for increased pH in the stomach. Eventually, all the parietal cells are lost and achlorhydria results leading to a loss of negative feedback on gastrin secretion. Plasma gastrin concentration is elevated in virtually all individuals with mucolipidosis type IV (mean 1507 pg/mL; range 400-4100 pg/mL) (normal 0-200 pg/mL) secondary to a constitutive achlorhydria. This finding facilitates the diagnosis of patients with this neurogenetic disorder. Additionally, elevated gastrin levels may be present in chronic gastritis resulting from H. pylori infection.

== History ==
Its existence was first suggested in 1905 by the British physiologist John Sydney Edkins, and gastrins were isolated in 1964 by Hilda Tracy and Roderic Alfred Gregory at the University of Liverpool. In 1964 the structure of gastrin was determined.
