= Parietal cell =

Epithelial cell in the stomach

- A parietal cell.

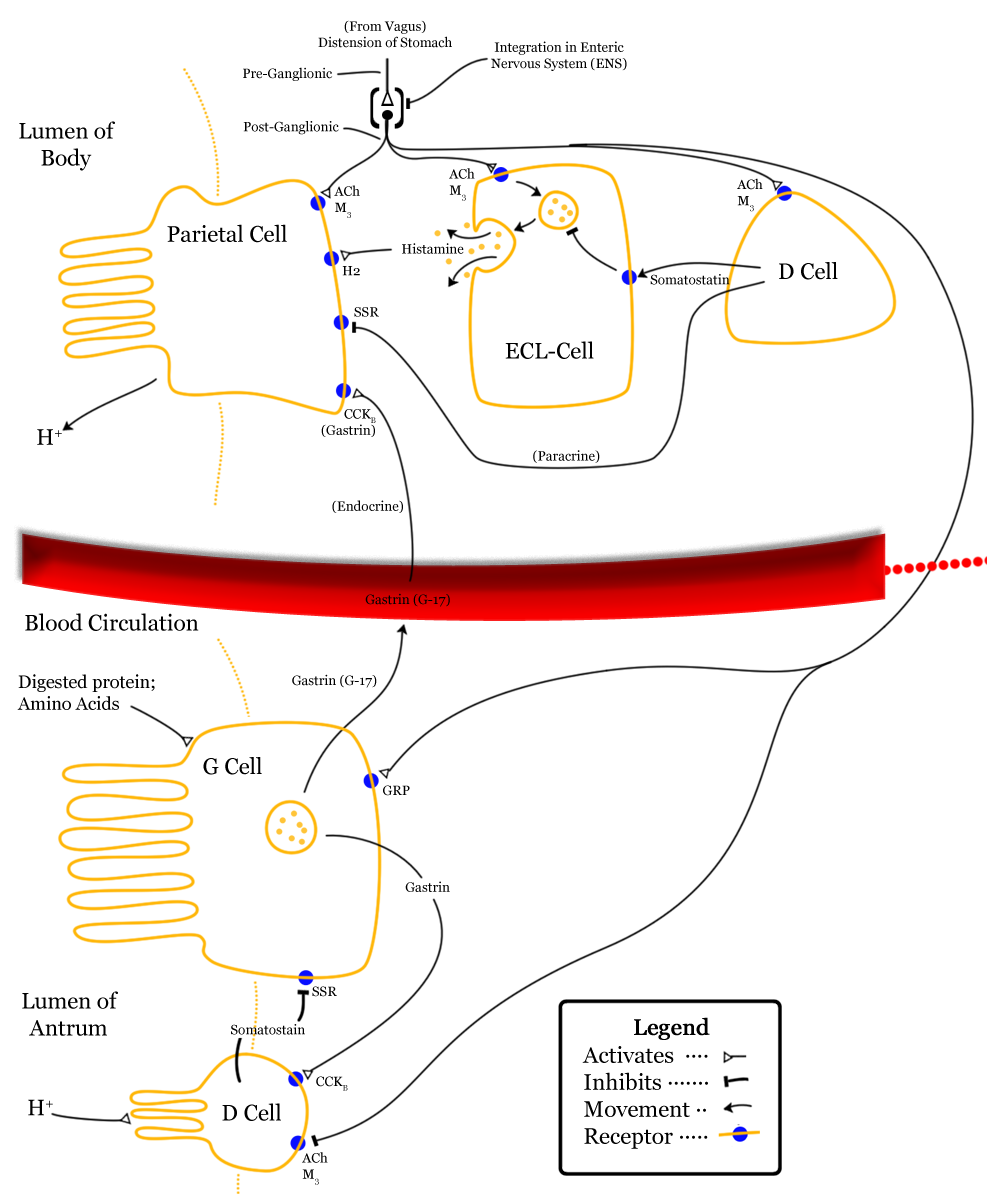
- Control of stomach acid

Details
- Location: Stomach
- Function: Gastric acid, intrinsic factor secretion

Identifiers
- Latin: exocrinocytus parietalis
- MeSH: D010295
- TH: H3.04.02.1.00033
- FMA: 62901

Parietal cells (also known as oxyntic cells) are epithelial cells in the stomach that secrete hydrochloric acid (HCl) and intrinsic factor. These cells are located in the gastric glands found in the lining of the fundus and body regions of the stomach. They contain an extensive secretory network of canaliculi from which the HCl is secreted by active transport into the stomach. The gastric hydrogen potassium ATPase (H^{+}/K^{+} ATPase) is highly enriched in parietal cells and transports H^{+} against a concentration gradient of about 3-4 million to 1 between plasma and the parietal cell canaliculus, generating one of the steepest ion gradients in mammalian tissues. Parietal cells are primarily regulated via histamine, acetylcholine and gastrin signalling from both central and local modulators.

== Structure ==
=== Canaliculus ===
A canaliculus is an adaptation found on gastric parietal cells. It is a deep infolding, or little channel, which serves to increase the surface area, e.g. for secretion. The parietal cell membrane is dynamic; the numbers of canaliculi rise and fall according to secretory need. This is accomplished by the fusion of canalicular precursors, or tubulovesicles, with the membrane to increase surface area, and the reciprocal endocytosis of the canaliculi (reforming the tubulovesicles) to decrease it.

== Function ==
=== Hydrochloric acid secretion ===
Hydrochloric acid is formed in the following manner:

- Hydrogen ions are formed from the dissociation of carbonic acid. Water is a very minor source of hydrogen ions in comparison to carbonic acid. Carbonic acid is formed from carbon dioxide and water by carbonic anhydrase.
- The bicarbonate ion (HCO_{3}^{−}) is exchanged for a chloride ion (Cl^{−}) on the basal side of the cell and the bicarbonate diffuses into the venous blood, leading to an alkaline tide phenomenon.
- Potassium (K^{+}) and chloride (Cl^{−}) ions diffuse into the canaliculi.
- Hydrogen ions are pumped out of the cell into the canaliculi in exchange for potassium ions, via the H^{+}/K^{+}-ATPase. These pumps are increased in number on luminal side by fusion of tubulovesicles during activation of parietal cells and removed during deactivation. This pump maintains a million-fold difference in proton concentration. ATP is provided by the numerous mitochondria.

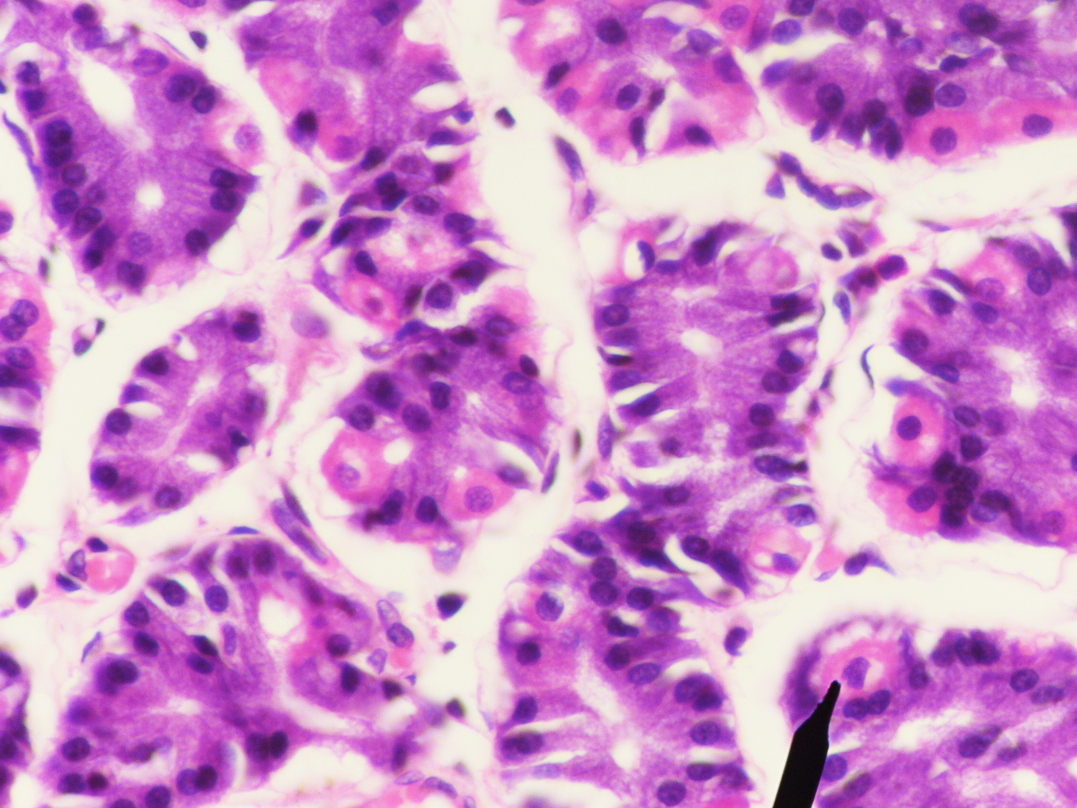
Human parietal cells (pink staining) – stomach.

As a result of the cellular export of hydrogen ions, the gastric lumen is maintained as a highly acidic environment. The acidity aids in digestion of food by promoting the unfolding (or denaturing) of ingested proteins. As proteins unfold, the peptide bonds linking component amino acids are exposed. Gastric HCl simultaneously cleaves pepsinogen, a zymogen, into active pepsin, an endopeptidase that advances the digestive process by breaking the now-exposed peptide bonds, a process known as proteolysis.

=== Regulation ===
Parietal cells secrete acid in response to three types of stimuli:

- Histamine, stimulating H_{2} histamine receptors (most significant contribution).
- Acetylcholine (ACh), from parasympathetic activity via the vagus nerve and enteric nervous system, stimulating M_{3} receptors.
- Gastrin, stimulating CCK2 receptors (least significant contribution, but also causes histamine secretion by local ECL cells).

Activation of histamine through H_{2} receptor causes increases in the intracellular cAMP level, while ACh through M_{3} receptor and gastrin through CCK2 receptor increases intracellular calcium level. These receptors are present on basolateral side of membrane.

Increased cAMP level results in increased protein kinase A. Protein kinase A phosphorylates proteins involved in the transport of H^{+}/K^{+}-ATPase from the cytoplasm to the cell membrane. This causes resorption of K^{+} ions and secretion of H^{+} ions. The pH of the secreted fluid can fall by 0.8.

Gastrin primarily induces acid-secretion indirectly, increasing histamine synthesis in ECL cells, which in turn signal parietal cells via histamine release and H_{2} stimulation. Gastrin itself has no effect on the maximum histamine-stimulated gastric acid secretion.

The effect of histamine, acetylcholine and gastrin is synergistic, that is, effect of two simultaneously is more than additive of effect of the two individually. It helps in non-linear increase of secretion with stimuli physiologically.

=== Intrinsic factor secretion ===
Parietal cells also produce a glycoprotein known as intrinsic factor. Intrinsic factor is required for the absorption of vitamin B_{12} in the diet. A long-term deficiency in vitamin B_{12} can lead to megaloblastic anemia, characterized by large fragile red blood cells. Pernicious anaemia results from autoimmune destruction of gastric parietal cells, precluding the synthesis of intrinsic factor and, by extension, absorption of vitamin B_{12}. Pernicious anemia also leads to megaloblastic anemia. Atrophic gastritis, particularly in the elderly, will cause an inability to absorb B_{12} and can lead to deficiencies such as decreased DNA synthesis and nucleotide metabolism in the bone marrow.

== Clinical significance ==
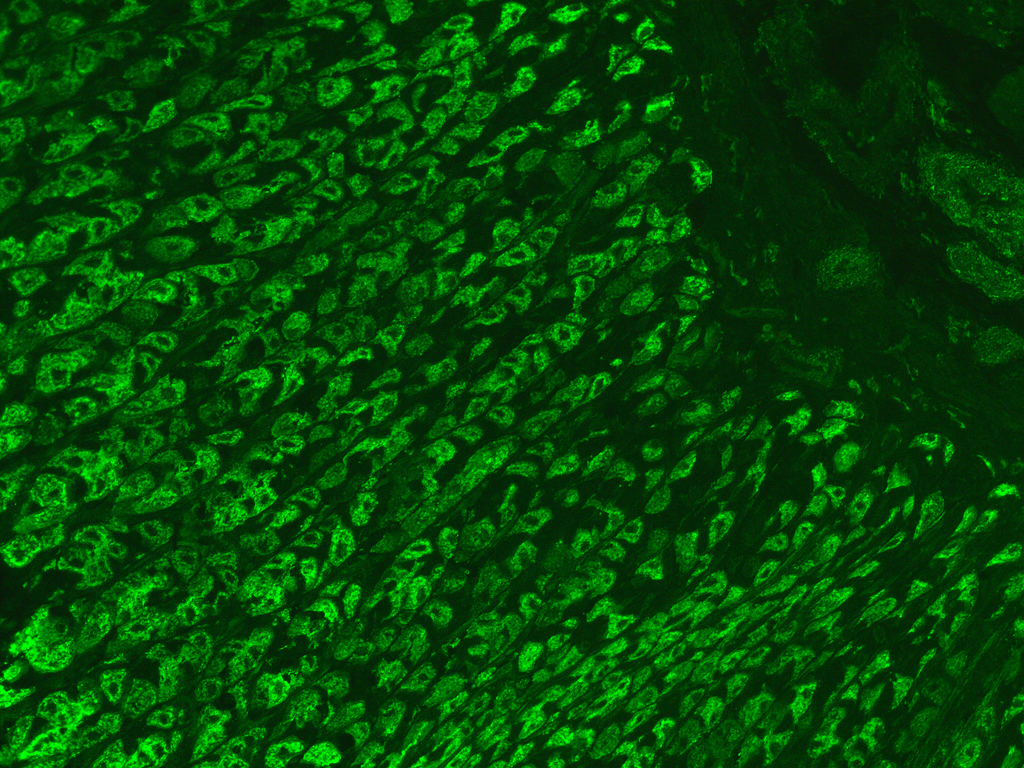
Immunofluorescence staining pattern of gastric parietal antibodies on a stomach section

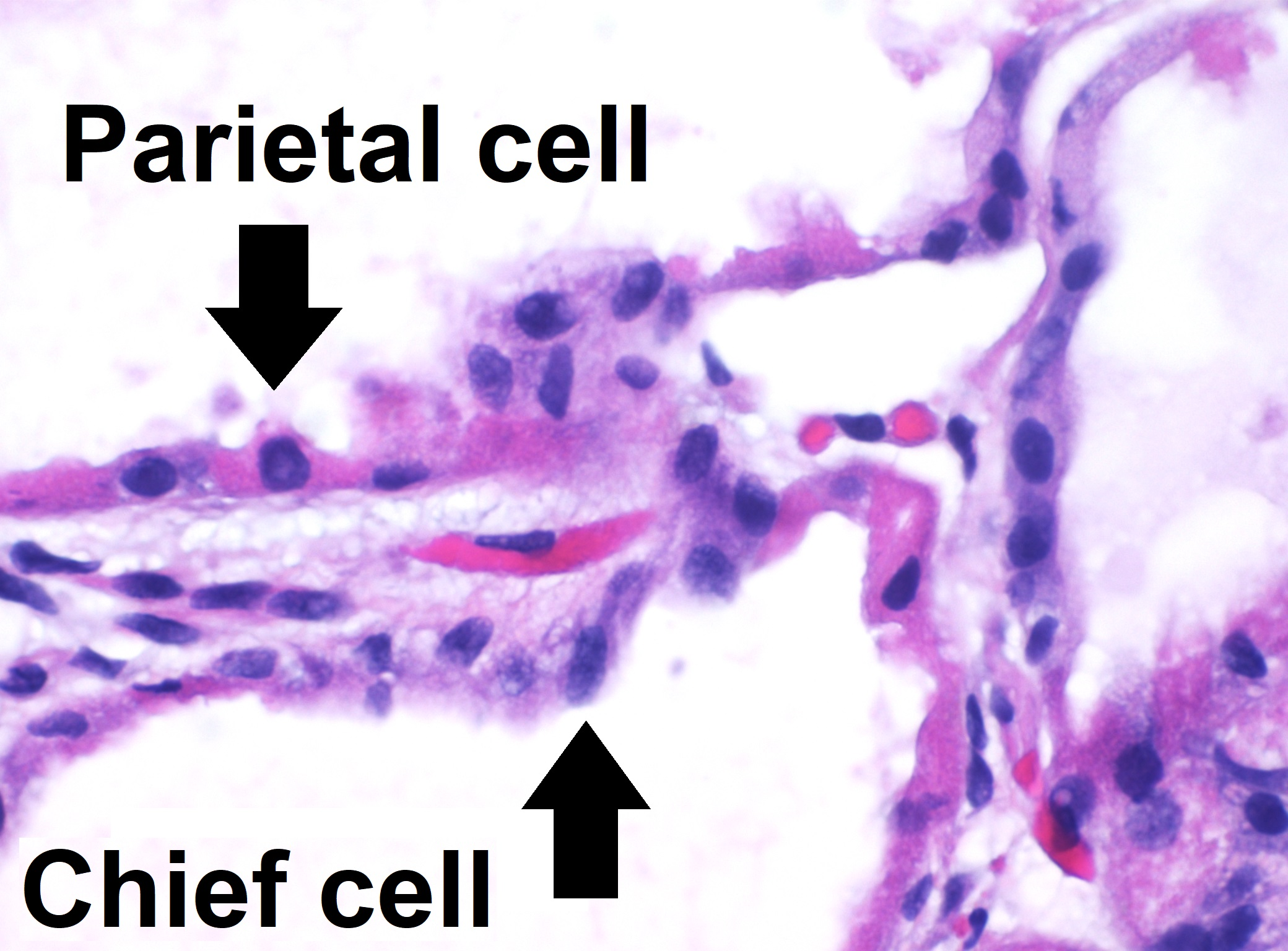
Parietal cells are part of fundic gland polyps (here shown in high magnification).

- Peptic ulcers can result from over-acidity in the stomach. Antacids can be used to enhance the natural tolerance of the gastric lining. Antimuscarinic drugs such as pirenzepine or H_{2} antihistamines can reduce acid secretion. Proton pump inhibitors are more potent at reducing gastric acid production since that is the final common pathway of all stimulation of acid production.
- In pernicious anemia, autoantibodies directed against parietal cells or intrinsic factor cause a reduction in vitamin B_{12} absorption. It can be treated with injections of replacement vitamin B_{12} (methylcobalamin, hydroxocobalamin or cyanocobalamin).
- Achlorhydria is another autoimmune disease of the parietal cells. The damaged parietal cells are unable to produce the required amount of gastric acid. This leads to an increase in gastric pH, impaired digestion of food and increased risk of gastroenteritis.

== See also ==
- Gastric chief cell
- Digestion
- Gastroesophageal reflux disease
- Discovery and Development of Proton Pump Inhibitors
- List of human cell types derived from the germ layers
