= Anatomical terms of microanatomy =

Histological lexicon for (micro)anatomical structures

A histological scope of anatomical terminology describes structure, layout and position more precisely and mitigates ambiguity. An internationally accepted lexicon is Terminologia Histologica.

== Layout ==
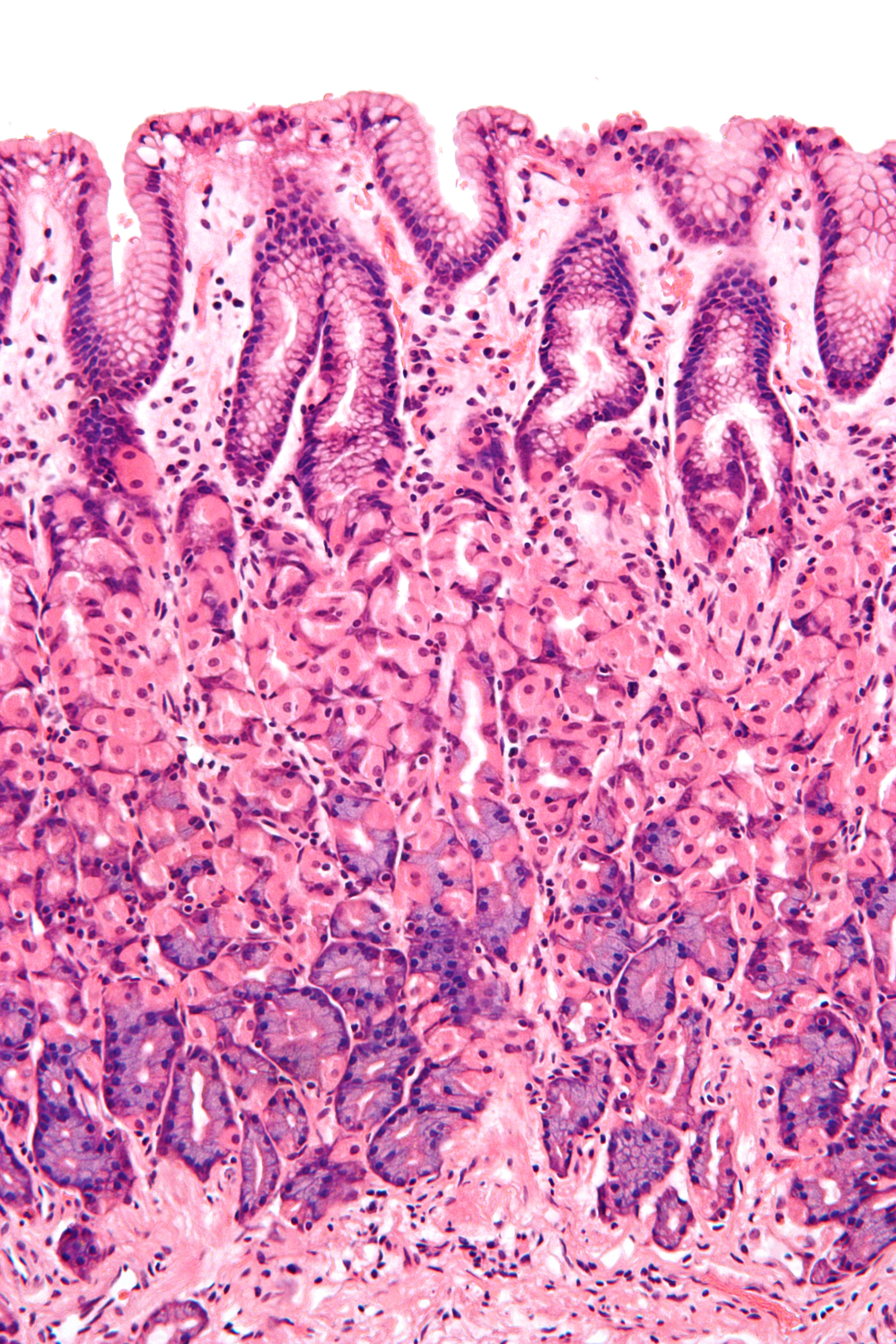
This Histological section taken from the gastric antrum, showing the stomach wall. The lumen of the stomach is the upper empty portion, and is surrounded by a single layer of columnar cells, called simple columnar epithelium.

=== Epithelia and endothelia ===
Epithelial cells line body surfaces, and are described according to their shape, with three principal shapes: squamous, columnar, and cuboidal.

- Squamous epithelium has cells that are wider than their height (flat and scale-like).
- Cuboidal epithelium has cells whose height and width are approximately the same (cube shaped).
- Columnar epithelium has cells taller than they are wide (column-shaped).

Endothelium refers to cells that line the interior surface of blood vessels and lymphatic vessels, forming an interface between circulating blood or lymph in the lumen and the rest of the vessel wall. It is a thin layer of simple, or single-layered, squamous cells called endothelial cells. Endothelial cells in direct contact with blood are called vascular endothelial cells, whereas those in direct contact with lymph are known as lymphatic endothelial cells.

Epithelium can be arranged in a single layer of cells described as "simple", or more than one layer, described as "stratified". By layer, epithelium is classed as either simple epithelium, only one cell thick (unilayered) or stratified epithelium as stratified squamous epithelium, stratified cuboidal epithelium, and stratified columnar epithelium that are two or more cells thick (multi-layered), and both types of layering can be made up of any of the cell shapes. However, when taller simple columnar epithelial cells are viewed in cross section showing several nuclei appearing at different heights, they can be confused with stratified epithelia. This kind of epithelium is therefore described as pseudostratified columnar epithelium.

Transitional epithelium has cells that can change from squamous to cuboidal, depending on the amount of tension on the epithelium.

=== Mucosa ===
A mucous membrane or mucosa is a membrane that lines various cavities in the body and covers the surface of internal organs. It consists of one or more layers of epithelial cells overlying a layer of loose connective tissue. It is mostly of endodermal origin and is continuous with the skin at various body openings such as the eyes, ears, inside the nose, inside the mouth, lip, the urethral opening and the anus. Some mucous membranes secrete mucus, a thick protective fluid. The function of the membrane is to stop pathogens and dirt from entering the body and to prevent bodily tissues from becoming dehydrated.

=== Submucosal and muscular layers ===
The submucosa consists of a dense and irregular layer of connective tissue with blood vessels, lymphatics, and nerves branching into the mucosa and muscular layer. It contains the submucous plexus, and enteric nervous plexus, situated on the inner surface of the muscular layer.

The muscular layer (also known as the muscularis propria ) consists of two layers of muscle, the inner and outer layer. The muscle of the inner layer is arranged in circular rings around the tract, whereas the muscle of the outer layer is arranged longitudinally. The stomach has an extra layer, an inner oblique muscular layer. Between the two muscle layers are the myenteric or Auerbach's plexus. This controls peristalsis. Activity is initiated by the pacemaker cells (interstitial cells of Cajal). The gut has intrinsic peristaltic activity (basal electrical rhythm) due to its self-contained enteric nervous system. The rate can of course be modulated by the rest of the autonomic nervous system.

The layers are not truly longitudinal or circular, rather the layers of muscle are helical with different pitches. The inner circular is helical with a steep pitch and the outer longitudinal is helical with a much shallower pitch.

=== Serosa and adventitia ===
- Serosa (if the tissue is intraperitoneal) / Adventitia (if the tissue is retroperitoneal) -- these last two tissue types differ slightly in form and function according to the part of the gastrointestinal tract they belong to.

== Position on the cell membrane ==
The hollow inner part of a body organ (such as the gastrointestinal tract) or tube (such as an artery) is called the lumen. The side of a cell facing the lumen is called the apical surface; the opposite side, facing away from the lumen is the basolateral surface, which faces instead towards the interstitium, and away from the lumen.
