= Duct (anatomy) =

Channel leading from a bodily gland or organ

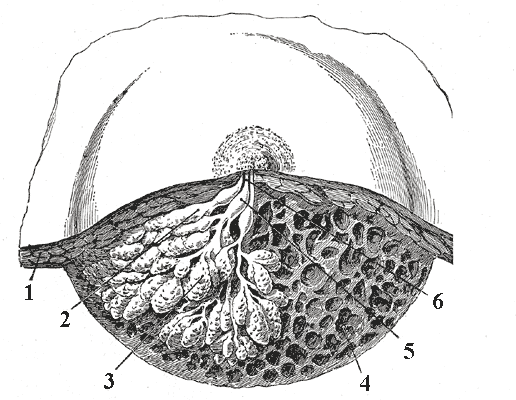
- Dissection of a lactating breast. 1 - Fat; 2 - Lactiferous duct/lobule 3 - Lobule; 4 - Connective tissue 5 - Sinus of lactiferous duct 6 - Lactiferous duct

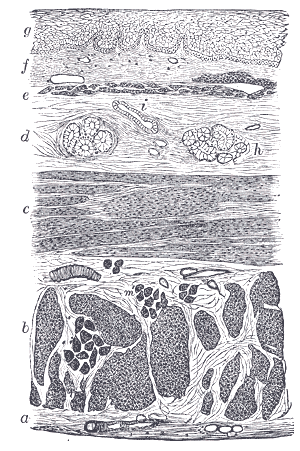
- Section of the human esophagus. Moderately magnified. The section is transverse and from near the middle of the gullet. a. Adventitia. b. Divided fibers of longitudinal muscular coat. c. Transverse muscular fibers. d. Submucous or areolar layer. e. Muscularis mucosae. f. Mucous membrane, with vessels and part of a lymphoid nodule. g. Stratified epithelial lining. h. Mucous gland. i. Gland duct. m’. Striated muscular fibers cut across.

Identifiers
- FMA: 30320

In anatomy and physiology, a duct is a circumscribed channel leading from an exocrine gland or organ.

== Types of ducts ==
Examples include:

Duct	From	To	Carries
Lactiferous duct	mammary gland	nipple	milk
Cystic duct	gallbladder	common bile duct	bile
Common hepatic duct	liver	common bile duct	bile
Common bile duct	common hepatic duct and cystic duct	pancreatic duct	bile
Pancreatic duct	pancreas	hepatopancreatic ampulla	bile and pancreatic enzymes
Ejaculatory duct	vas deferens	urethra	semen
Parotid duct	parotid gland	mouth	saliva
Submandibular duct	submandibular gland	mouth	saliva
Major sublingual duct	sublingual gland	mouth	saliva
Bartholin's ducts	Bartholin's glands	vulva	Bartholin's fluid
Cerebral aqueduct	fourth ventricle	third ventricle	cerebrospinal fluid

== Duct system ==
As ducts travel from the acinus which generates the fluid to the target, the ducts become larger and the epithelium becomes thicker. The parts of the system are classified as follows:

Type of duct	Epithelium	Surroundings
intralobular duct	simple cuboidal	parenchyma
interlobular duct	simple columnar	connective tissue
interlobar duct	stratified columnar	connective tissue

Some sources consider "lobar" ducts to be the same as "interlobar ducts", while others consider lobar ducts to be larger and more distal from the acinus. For sources that make the distinction, the interlobar ducts are more likely to classified with simple columnar epithelium (or pseudostratified epithelium), reserving the stratified columnar for the lobar ducts.

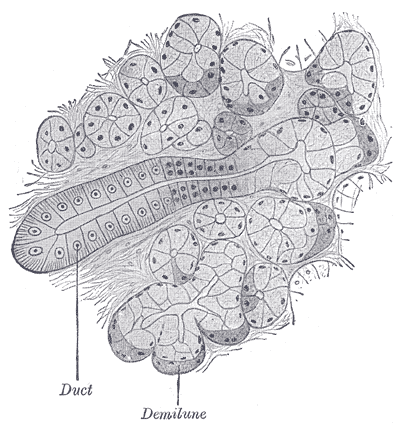
Section of submaxillary gland of kitten. Duct semidiagrammatic. X 200.

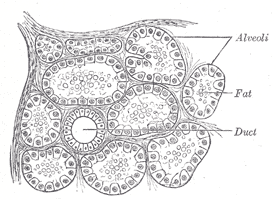
Section of portion of mamma.

=== Intercalated duct ===
Intercalated duct (ducts of Boll)
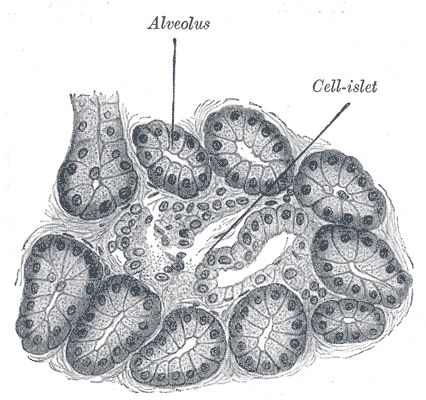
- Section of pancreas of dog. X 250. (Intercalated ducts visible but not labeled.)

- Centroacinar cells

Details
- Part of: Exocrine glands

Identifiers
- FMA: 30320

The intercalated duct, also called intercalary duct (ducts of Boll), is the portion of an exocrine gland leading directly from the acinus to a striated duct. The intercalated duct forms part of the intralobular duct. This duct has the thinnest epithelium of any part of the duct system, and the epithelium is usually classified as "low" simple cuboidal.

They are found in both the pancreas and in salivary glands.

=== Striated duct ===
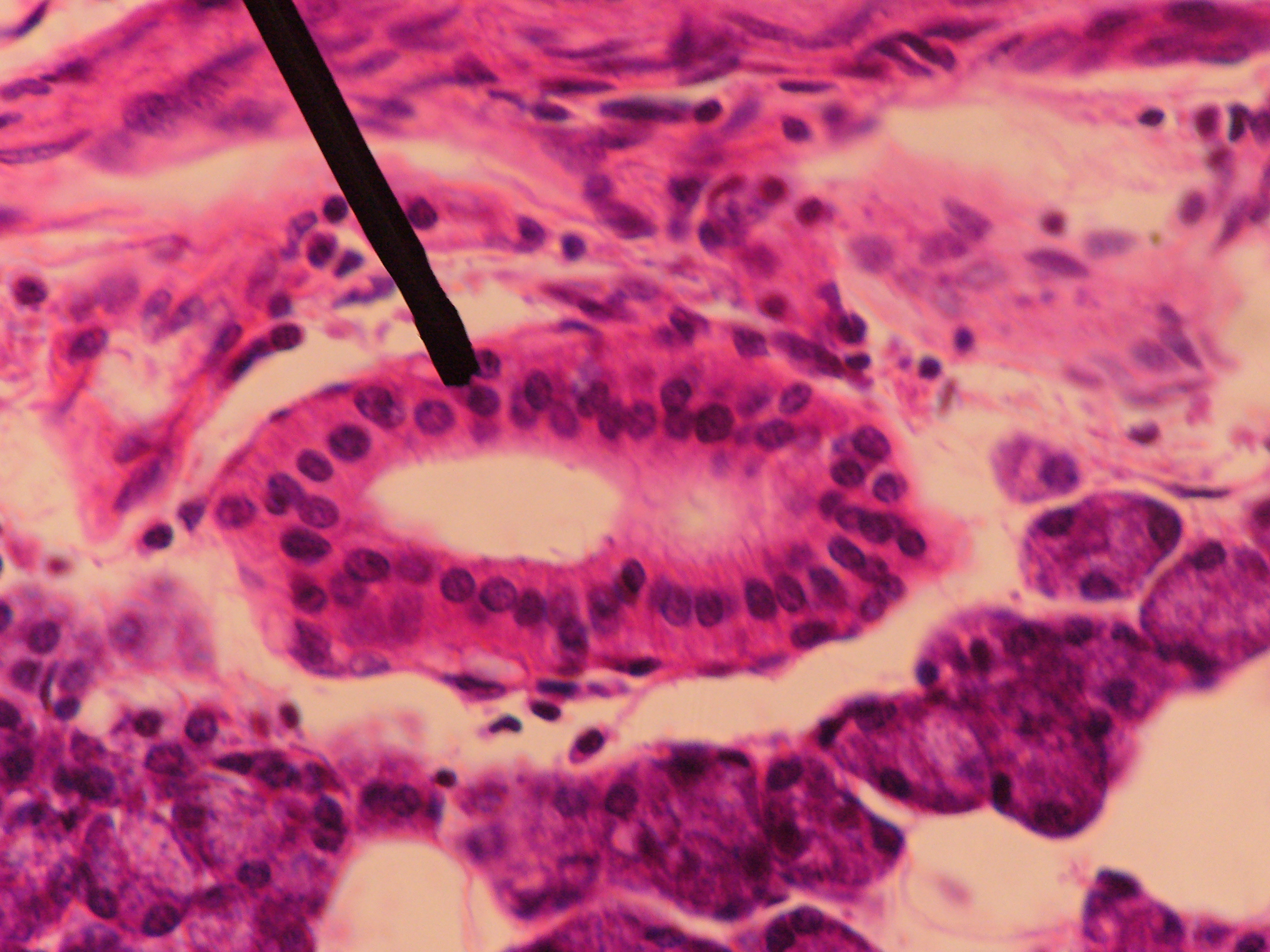
Striated duct in parotid gland

A striated duct (Pflüger's ducts) is a gland duct which connects an intercalated duct to an interlobular duct. It is characterized by the basal infoldings of its plasma membrane, characteristic of ion-pumping activity by the numerous mitochondria. Along with the intercalated ducts, they function to modify salivary fluid by secreting HCO_{3}^{−} and K^{+} and reabsorbing Na^{+} and Cl^{−} using the Na-K pump and the Cl-HCO_{3} pump, making the saliva hypotonic.

Their epithelium can be simple cuboidal or simple columnar.

Striated ducts are part of the intralobular ducts.

They are found in the submandibular gland, sublingual duct, and the parotid gland, but are more developed in the parotid gland.

They are not present in pancreas.

=== Intralobular duct ===
An intralobular duct is the portion of an exocrine gland inside a lobule, leading directly from acinus to an interlobular duct (between lobules). It is composed of two subdivisions, the intercalated duct and the striated duct.

In the human mammary gland, the intralobular duct is a part of the glandular system that resides within the lobules. Lobules contain clusters of ducts whose secretory alveolies are drained by the intralobular duct. The intralobular ducts are usually lined with simple cuboidal epithelial cells that are lined by myoepithelial cells as well.

The intralobular ducts of the lobules drain into the interlobular ducts between lobules.

They can be seen in:

- pancreas
- salivary glands

== See also ==
- Ductal carcinoma
- Endocrine gland
- List of distinct cell types in the adult human body
