= Stratified epithelium =

Stratified epithelium may refer to:

- Stratified columnar epithelium
- Stratified cuboidal epithelium
- Stratified squamous epithelium

== See also ==
- Epithelium
