= Ankycorbin =

RAI14

Identifiers
- Aliases: RAI14, NORPEG, RAI13, retinoic acid induced 14
- External IDs: OMIM: 606586; MGI: 1922896; GeneCards: RAI14

Gene location (Human)
Chr.	Chromosome 5 (human)
Band	5p13.2	Start	34,656,328 bp
Band	5p13.2	End	34,832,612 bp

Gene location (Mouse)
Chr.	Chromosome 15 (mouse)
Band	15|15 A1	Start	10,569,055 bp
Band	15|15 A1	End	10,714,710 bp
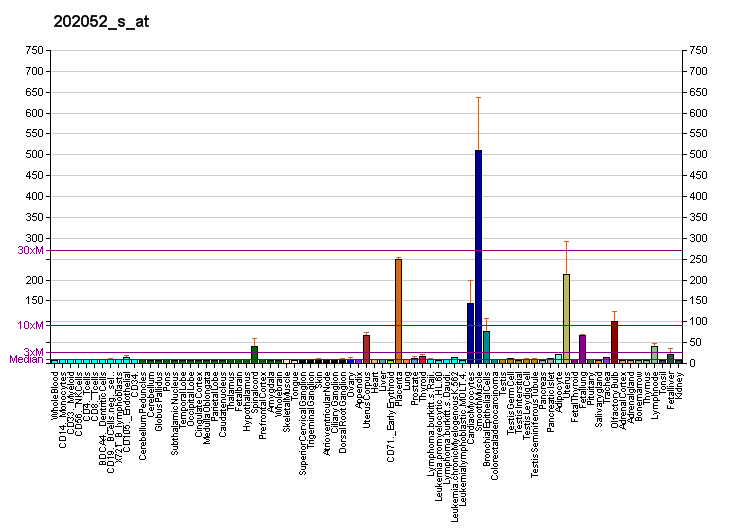
RNA expression pattern
Bgee	Human / Mouse (ortholog); Top expressed in: stromal cell of endometrium; visceral pleura; ventricular zone; smooth muscle tissue; placenta; decidua; glomerulus; amniotic fluid; metanephric glomerulus; myometrium / Top expressed in: renal corpuscle; lumbar spinal ganglion; ciliary body; left lung lobe; iris; hair follicle; endothelial cell of lymphatic vessel; ureter; maxillary prominence; sciatic nerve; More reference expression data
BioGPS	More reference expression data
Gene ontology
Molecular function	protein binding
Cellular component	cell cortex; cytoskeleton; nucleus; fibrillar center; cytoplasm; cytosol; cell junction
Biological process	spermatogenesis; cell differentiation
Sources:Amigo / QuickGO
Orthologs
Databases	NCBI: entry; OMA: entry
Species	Human	Mouse
Entrez	26064	75646
Ensembl	ENSG00000039560	ENSMUSG00000022246
UniProt	Q9P0K7	Q9EP71
RefSeq (mRNA)	NM_001145520; NM_001145521; NM_001145522; NM_001145523; NM_001145525 NM_015577	NM_001166408; NM_030690; NM_001356534
RefSeq (protein)	NP_001138992; NP_001138993; NP_001138994; NP_001138995; NP_001138997 NP_056392	NP_001159880; NP_109615; NP_001343463
Location (UCSC)	Chr 5: 34.66 – 34.83 Mb	Chr 15: 10.57 – 10.71 Mb
PubMed search
- Wikidata
View/Edit Human	View/Edit Mouse

Ankycorbin is an ankyrin repeat and coiled-coil domain containing protein that in humans is encoded by the RAI14 gene. Ankycorbin has been associated with the cortical actin cytoskeleton structures in terminal web, cell-cell adhesion sites as well as stress fibres. It is expressed in a variety of human tissues and is thought to play a role in actin regulation of ectoplasmic specialization, establishment of sperm polarity and sperm adhesion. It may also promote the integrity of Sertoli cell tight junctions at the blood testis barrier.

== Gene ==
=== Location ===
RAI14 contains 15 exons and is located on the plus strand of chromosome number 5 at position 5p13.2. It spans 5,068 base pairs from position 34,656,328 to 34,832,612.

=== Gene Neighborhood ===
Genes TTC23L and LOC105374721 neighbor RAI14 on chromosome 5.

=== Expression ===
RAI14 is expressed within a wide range of human tissues. Some areas of the highest expression by TPM (transcripts per million) include tissues of the endometrium, smooth muscle, cervix, cervix, testis, and spleen. Within the human brain, RAI14 expression is abundant in the area around the brain stem and medulla. The highest expression levels came from the myelencephalon, a region of the embryonic brain that would later become the medulla oblongata.

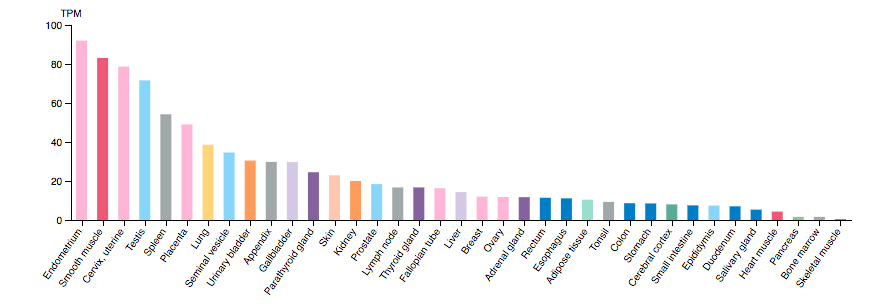
RAI14 protein expression within human tissues

== Homology ==
=== Paralogs ===
RAI14 does not have any paralogs.

=== Orthologs ===
Most of the entire sequence of the ankycorbin protein is well conserved between the majority of mammals and vertebrates. More distantly related orthologs, such as sharks, begin to lose similarity and become less conserved in the C-terminus end of the protein. Ankycorbin is not well conserved within invertebrates, such as coral, at all. The latter half of the protein is largely missing and the only portion that retains some semblance of conservation is the area near the N-terminus that is associated with the ankyrin repeat domain.

Table of RAI14 Orthologs
Genus and species	Common name	Date of Divergence (from Homo sapiens)	NCBI Accession Number	Sequence length (Amino Acids)	Sequence Identity
Homo sapiens	Human		NP_001138992.1	980	100%
Castor canadensis	North American Beaver	88 MYA	XP_020026070.1	980	92%
Delphinapterus leucas	Beluga Whale	94 MYA	XP_022455298.1	980	90%
Pelecanus crispus	Dalmatian pelican	320 MYA	XP_009485865.1	977	69%
Python bivittatus	Burmese python	320 MYA	XP_007432514.1	992	66%
Xenopus laevis	African clawed frog	353 MYA	XP_018100022.1	971	53%
Rhincodon typus	Whale Shark	465 MYA	XP_020373853.1	719	46%
Stylophora pistillata	Coral	685 MYA	XP_022783988.1	653	31%

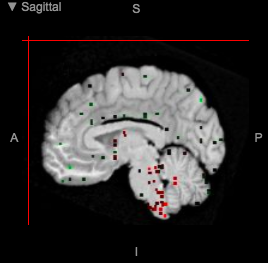
An image depicting RAI14 expression levels within the human brain

== Protein ==
=== Transcripts ===
Ankycorbin has four different isoforms (A, B, C, and D) with most isoforms containing one or more splice variants that mainly differ in the 5' UTR. Isoform D is the longest known isoform at 983 amino acids in length, however isoform A (980 amino acids) is the most predominant form of the protein.

=== General Properties ===
The RAI14 protein has a predicted weight of 110.0 kDal and an isoelectric point of 5.87. It's also predicted to have glutamine rich region between nucleotides 914-978 and is otherwise rich in lycine, glutamate, and serine while being poor in glycine and phenylalanine. It is a soluble protein.

=== Structure and Domains ===
Ankycorbin contains an ankyrin repeat region located near the N-terminus that consists of 6 ankyrin repeats. The protein is predominantly composed of alpha helices and coiled-coil domains with no predicted beta-sheet structures.

=== Post Translational Modifications ===
RAI14 is a highly phosphorylated protein with hundreds of predicted phosphorylation sites. It is predicted to be a nuclear protein and contains 3 nuclear localization signals.

== Function ==
RAI14 is predicted to play a role in cell-cell adhesion sites, particularly the cell-cell interactions of Sertoli cells from within the testis. Sertoli cells are involved in the creation of the blood testis barrier and provides a specialized, protected environment within the seminiferous tubules of the testis for germ cell development.
