= Brush border =

Microvilli-covered surface of epithelium found throughout the body

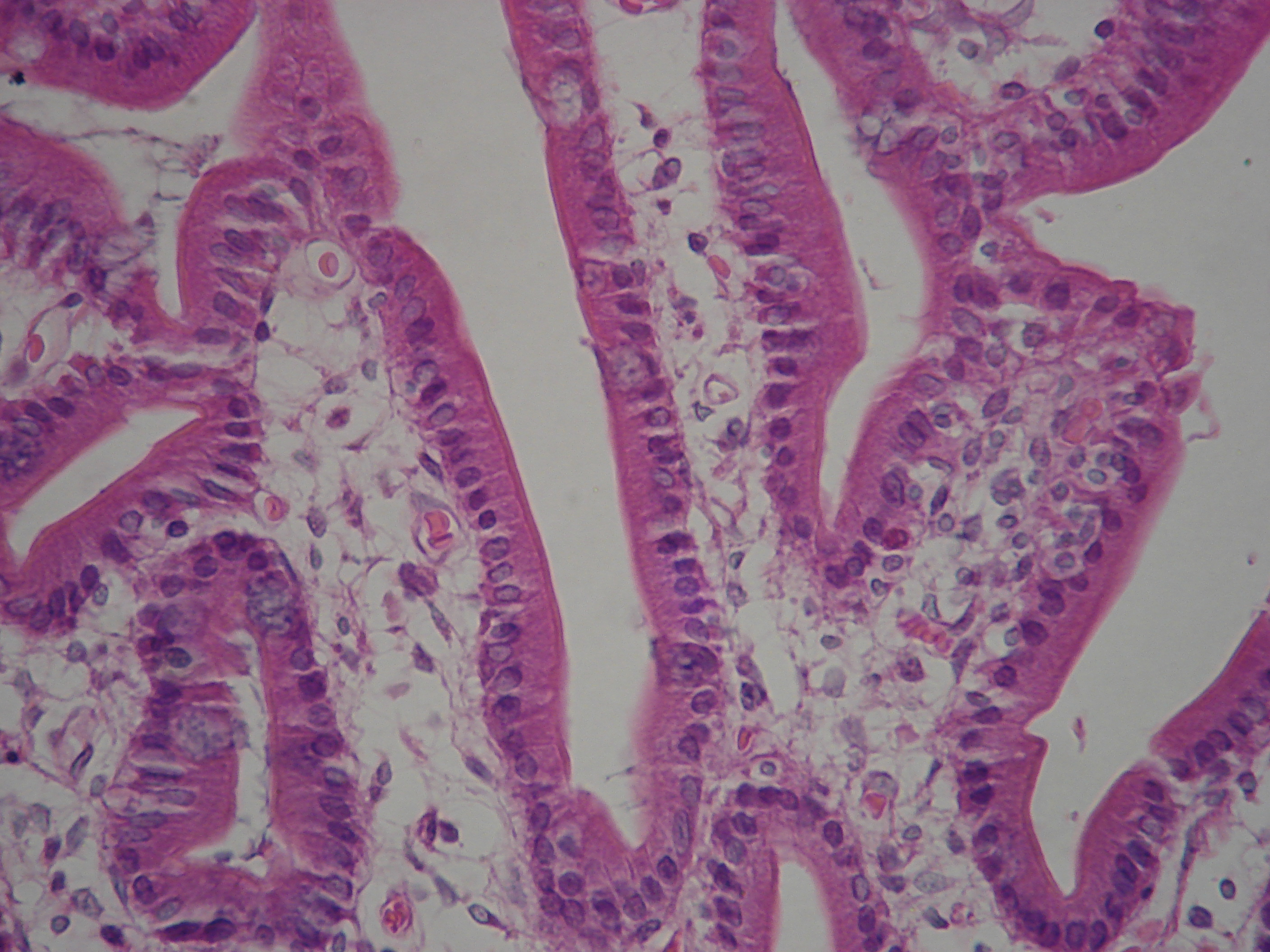
Duodenum with brush border of microvilli.

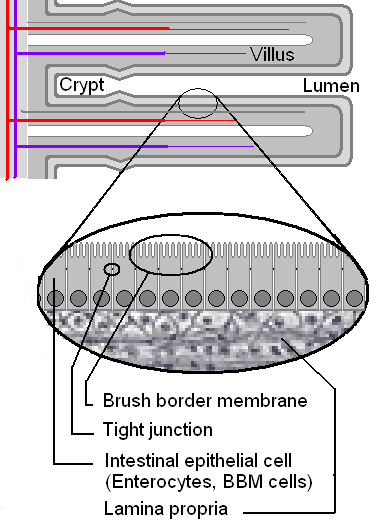
Illustration of the brush border membrane of small intestinal villi

A brush border (striated border or brush border membrane) is the microvillus-covered surface of simple cuboidal and simple columnar epithelium found in different parts of the body. Microvilli are approximately 100 nanometers in diameter and their length varies from approximately 100 to 2,000 nanometers. Because individual microvilli are so small and are tightly packed in the brush border, individual microvilli can only be resolved using electron microscopes; with a light microscope they can usually only be seen collectively as a fuzzy fringe at the surface of the epithelium. This fuzzy appearance gave rise to the term brush border, as early anatomists noted that this structure appeared very much like the bristles of a paintbrush.

Brush border cells are found mainly in the following organs:

- The small intestine tract: This is where absorption takes place. The brush borders of the intestinal lining are the site of terminal carbohydrate digestions. The microvilli that constitute the brush border have enzymes for this final part of digestion anchored into their apical plasma membrane as integral membrane proteins. These enzymes are found near to the transporters that will then allow absorption of the digested nutrients.
- The kidney: Here the brush border is useful in distinguishing the proximal tubule (which possesses the brush border) from the distal convoluted tubule (which does not).
- The large intestine also has microvilli on the surface of its enterocytes.

The brush border morphology increases a cell's surface area, a trait which is especially useful in absorptive cells. Cells that absorb substances need a large surface area in contact with the substance to be efficient.

In intestinal cells, the microvilli are referred to as brush border and are protoplasmic extensions contrary to villi which are submucosal folds, while in the kidneys, microvilli are referred to as striated border.

The brush border of the small intestine fulfills an important barrier role, barring pathogens and many other unwelcome particles from accessing the enterocytes. Causative agents of gastrointestinal disease typically have the ability to inhibit this protective function of microvilli.

== See also ==
- List of distinct cell types in the adult human body
- Terminal web
