= Keratin 15 =

Protein found in humans

KRT15

Identifiers
- Aliases: KRT15, CK15, K15, K1CO, keratin 15
- External IDs: OMIM: 148030; MGI: 96689; GeneCards: KRT15

Gene location (Human)
Chr.	Chromosome 17 (human)
Band	17q21.2	Start	41,513,745 bp
Band	17q21.2	End	41,522,529 bp

Gene location (Mouse)
Chr.	Chromosome 11 (mouse)
Band	11 D|11 63.41 cM	Start	100,022,584 bp
Band	11 D|11 63.41 cM	End	100,026,754 bp
RNA expression pattern
Bgee	Human / Mouse (ortholog); Top expressed in: mucosa of pharynx; skin of thigh; skin of arm; skin of abdomen; epithelium of nasopharynx; gums; gingival epithelium; cervix epithelium; vulva; skin of hip / Top expressed in: conjunctival fornix; skin of abdomen; lip; esophagus; transitional epithelium of urinary bladder; skin of external ear; cornea; skin of back; umbilical cord; trachea; More reference expression data
BioGPS	n/a
Gene ontology
Molecular function	scaffold protein binding; structural constituent of cytoskeleton; protein binding; structural molecule activity
Cellular component	extracellular exosome; intermediate filament; nucleus; cytosol
Biological process	epidermis development; cytoskeleton organization; keratinization; cornification
Sources:Amigo / QuickGO
Orthologs
Databases	NCBI: entry; OMA: entry
Species	Human	Mouse
Entrez	3866	16665
Ensembl	ENSG00000171346	ENSMUSG00000054146
UniProt	P19012	Q61414
RefSeq (mRNA)	NM_002275	NM_008469
RefSeq (protein)	NP_002266	NP_032495
Location (UCSC)	Chr 17: 41.51 – 41.52 Mb	Chr 11: 100.02 – 100.03 Mb
PubMed search
- Wikidata
View/Edit Human	View/Edit Mouse

Keratin 15 is a protein that in humans is encoded by the KRT15 gene. It has also been referred to as cytokeratin 15, K1CO and KRTB.

Keratin 15 is a type I cytokeratin. It is well-expressed in the basal layer of complex epithelia. However, acral keratinocytes express little to no keratin 15.
