= Scutellum (insect anatomy) =

Anatomical structure on insects

The scutellum is the posterior portion of either the mesonotum or the metanotum of an insect thorax; however, it is used almost exclusively in the former context, as the metanotum is rather reduced in most insect groups. In the Hemiptera, and some Coleoptera, the scutellum is a small triangular plate behind the pronotum and between the forewing bases. In Diptera and Hymenoptera, the scutellum is nearly always distinct, but much smaller than (and immediately posterior to) the mesoscutum.

Scutellum in various types of insect

26 = Heteroptera scutellum

6 = Diptera scutellum

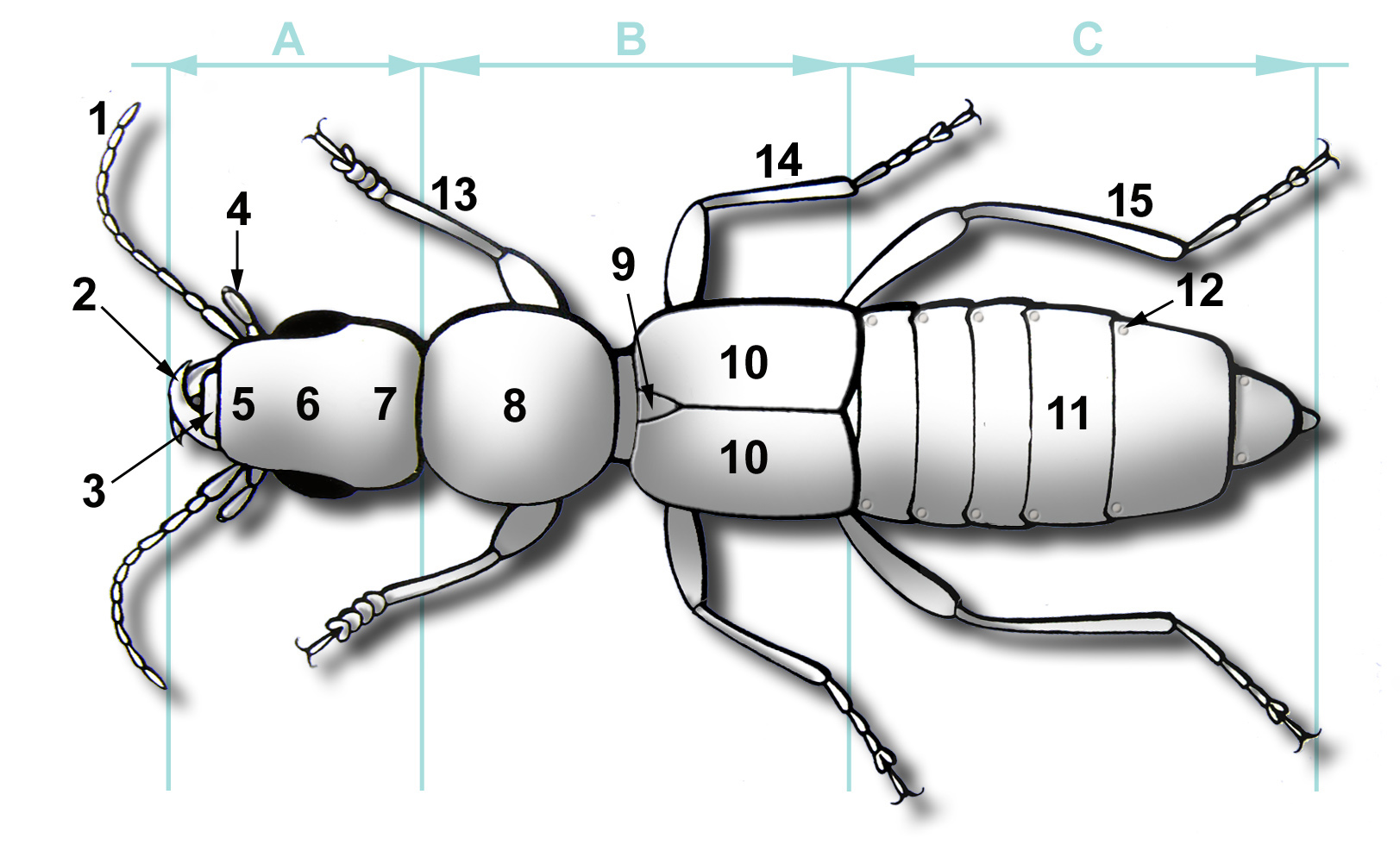
9 = Coleoptera scutellum

10 = Formicidae scutellum

== See also ==
- Scutoid
