= Microvillus =

Microscopic protrusion of a cell membrane that increases surface area substantially

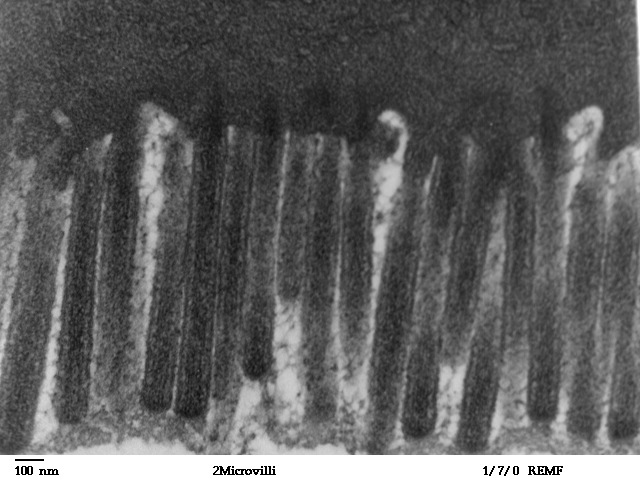
- Enterocytes with microvilli

Details

Identifiers
- Latin: microvillus
- MeSH: D008871
- TH: H1.00.01.1.01011
- FMA: 67296

Microvilli (sing.: microvillus) are microscopic cellular membrane protrusions that increase the surface area for diffusion and minimize any increase in volume, and are involved in a wide variety of functions, including absorption, secretion, cellular adhesion, and mechanotransduction.

== Structure ==
Microvilli are covered in plasma membrane, which encloses cytoplasm and microfilaments. Though these are cellular extensions, there are little or no cellular organelles present in the microvilli.

Each microvillus has a dense bundle of cross-linked actin filaments, which serves as its structural core. 20 to 30 tightly bundled actin filaments are cross-linked by bundling proteins fimbrin (or plastin-1), villin and espin to form the core of the microvilli.

In the enterocyte microvillus, the structural core is attached to the plasma membrane along its length by lateral arms made of myosin 1a and Ca^{2+} binding protein calmodulin. Myosin 1a functions through a binding site for filamentous actin on one end and a lipid binding domain on the other. The plus ends of the actin filaments are located at the tip of the microvillus and are capped, possibly by capZ proteins, while the minus ends are anchored in the terminal web composed of a complicated set of proteins including spectrin and myosin II.

The space between microvilli at a cell's surface is called the intermicrovillous space. Intermicrovillous space increases with contractile activity of myosin II and tropomyosin, and decreases when contraction ceases.

== Locations ==
Thousands of microvilli form a structure called the brush border that is found on the apical surface of some epithelial cells, such as the small intestines. (Microvilli should not be confused with intestinal villi, which are made of many cells. Each of these cells has many microvilli.) Microvilli are observed on the plasma surface of eggs, aiding in the anchoring of sperm cells that have penetrated the extracellular coat of egg cells. Clustering of elongated microtubules around a sperm allows for it to be drawn closer and held firmly so fusion can occur. They are large objects that increase surface area for absorption. Microvilli can be located in the Gustatory system as well, they sense the food molecules and chemicals so the taste pore can open up and interact with to send the signal to the brain.

Microvilli are also of importance on the cell surface of white blood cells, as they aid in the migration of white blood cells.

== Relationship to cell ==
Microvilli are formed as cell extensions from the plasma membrane surface.

Actin filaments, present in the cytosol, are most abundant near the cell surface. These filaments are thought to determine the shape and movement of the plasma membrane.

The nucleation of actin fibers occurs as a response to external stimuli, allowing a cell to alter its shape to suit a particular situation.

This could account for the uniformity of the microvilli, which are observed to be of equal length and diameter. This nucleation process occurs from the minus end, allowing rapid growth from the plus end.

Though the length and composition of microvilli is consistent within a certain group of homogenous cells, it can differ slightly in a different part of the same organism.

For example, the microvilli in the small and large intestines in mice are slightly different in length and amount of surface coat covering.

== Function ==
Microvilli function as the primary surface of nutrient absorption in the gastrointestinal tract. Because of this vital function, the microvillar membrane is packed with enzymes that aid in the breakdown of complex nutrients into simpler compounds that are more easily absorbed. For example, enzymes that digest carbohydrates called glycosidases are present at high concentrations on the surface of enterocyte microvilli. Thus, microvilli not only increase the cellular surface area for absorption, they also increase the number of digestive enzymes that can be present on the cell surface. Microvilli are also present on immune cells, allowing the immune cells to sense features on the surface of pathogens and other antigen-presenting cells.

=== Glycocalyx ===
The microvilli are covered with glycocalyx, consisting of peripheral glycoproteins that can attach themselves to a plasma membrane via transmembrane proteins.

This layer may be used to aid binding of substances needed for uptake, to adhere nutrients or as protection against harmful elements.

It can be another location for functional enzymes to be localized.

== Clinical significance ==
=== Destruction ===
The destruction of microvilli can occur in certain diseases because of the rearrangement of cytoskeleton in host cell. This is seen in infections caused by EPEC subgroup Escherichia coli, in celiac disease, and microvillus inclusion disease (an inherited disease characterized by defective microvilli and presence of cytoplasmic inclusions of the cell membrane other than the apical surface).

The destruction of microvilli can actually be beneficial sometimes, as in the case of elimination of microvilli on white blood cells which can be used to combat auto immune diseases.

Congenital lack of microvilli in the intestinal tract causes microvillus atrophy, a rare, usually fatal condition found in new-born babies.

== See also ==
- Chorionic villi
- Brush border
- Cilia
- Flagellum
- Intestinal villus
- Stereocilia
- Terminal web
