= Clara Grima =

Spanish mathematics professor

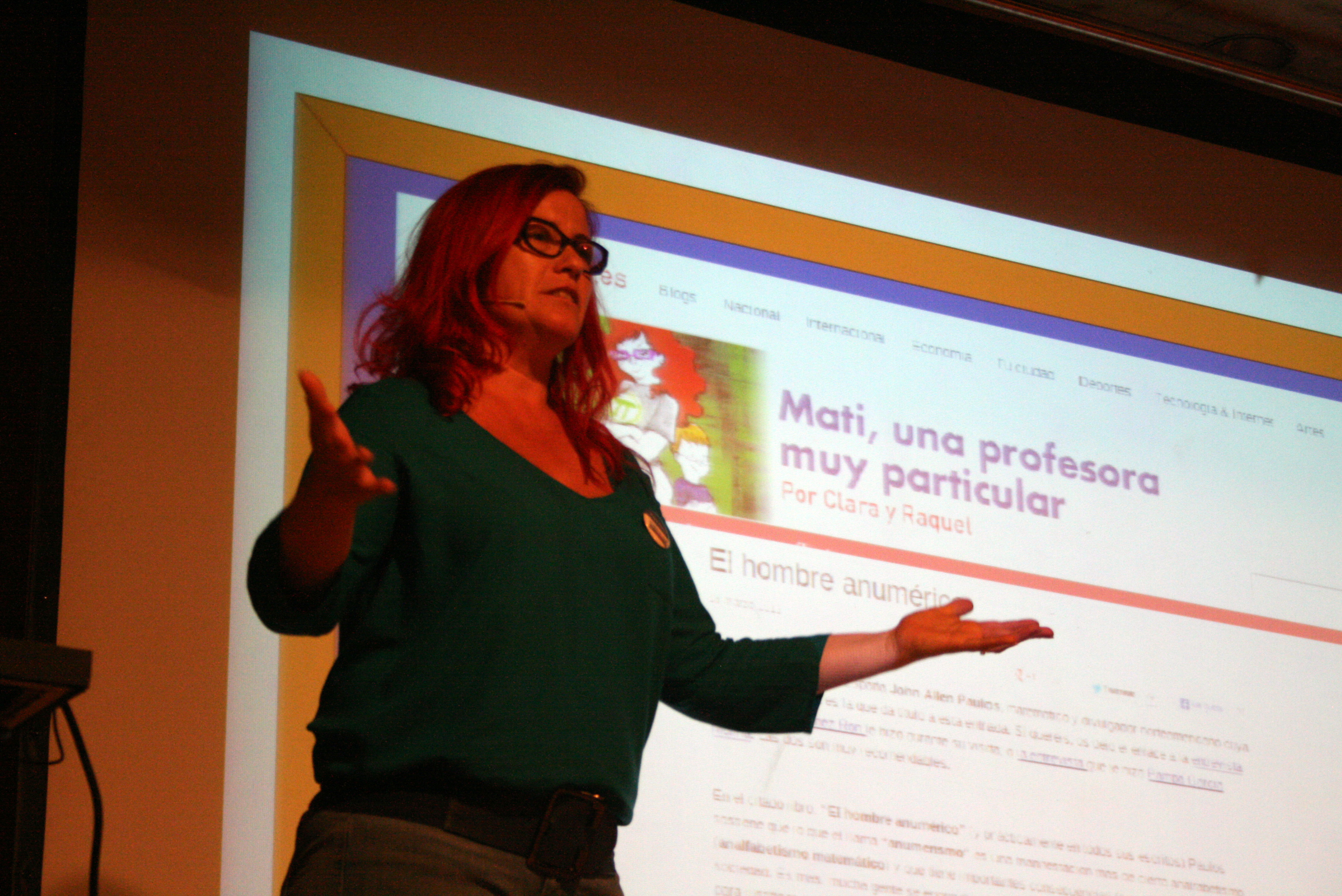
Clara Grima in May 2013

Clara Isabel Grima Ruiz (born 1971) is a professor of applied mathematics at the University of Seville, specializing in computational geometry. She is known for her research on scutoids (polyhedron-like shapes that can pack the space between pairs of curved surfaces) and for her popularization of mathematics.

== Education and career ==
Grima was born in 1971 in Coria del Río. She completed her doctorate in mathematics from the University of Seville in 1998, and is a professor of applied mathematics at the same university.

Grima also serves as president for the committee on popularization of the Royal Spanish Mathematical Society.

== Books ==
Grima's books include:

- Computational Geometry on Surfaces: Performing Computational Geometry on the Cylinder, the Sphere, the Torus, and the Cone (with Alberto Márquez, Kluwer, 2001)
- Mati y sus mateaventuras: Hasta el infinito y más allá (with Raquel Gu, Espasa, 2013)
- Las matemáticas vigilan tu salud: Modelos sobre epidemias y vacunas (Mathematics watches your health, with Enrique F. Borja, Next Door Publishers, 2017), on the applications of mathematics in epidemiology and personal health
- ¡Que las matemáticas te acompañen! (May mathematics be with you, Ariel, 2018) on the importance of mathematics in understanding the world
