= Scutoid =

Geometric solid between two parallel surfaces

A scutoid compared with a prism, frustum, and prismatoid

Two 5-6 scutoids, flipped and attached

A scutoid is a particular type of geometric solid between two parallel surfaces. The boundary of each of the surfaces (and of all the other parallel surfaces between them) either is a polygon or resembles a polygon, but is not necessarily planar, and the vertices of the two end polygons are joined by either a curve or a Y-shaped connection on at least one of the edges, but not necessarily all of the edges. Scutoids present at least one vertex between these two planes. Scutoids are not necessarily convex, and lateral faces are not necessarily planar, so several scutoids can pack together to fill all the space between the two parallel surfaces. They may be more generally described as a mix between a frustum and a prismatoid.

== Naming ==
The object was first described by Gómez-Gálvez et al. in a paper entitled Scutoids are a geometrical solution to three-dimensional packing of epithelia, and published in July 2018. Officially, the name scutoid was coined because of its resemblance to the shape of the scutum and scutellum in some insects, such as beetles in the subfamily Cetoniinae. Unofficially, Clara Grima has stated that while working on the project, the shape was temporarily called an Escu-toid as a joke after the biology group leader Luis M. Escudero. Since his last name, "Escudero", means "squire" (from Latin scutarius = shield-bearer), the temporary name was modified slightly to become "scutoid".

== Appearance in nature ==
"The shape, however odd, is a building block of multicellular organisms; complex life might never have emerged on Earth without it."

— Alan Burdick, We Are All Scutoids: A Brand New Shape, Explained

Epithelial cells adopt the "scutoidal shape" under certain circumstances. In epithelia, cells can 3D-pack as scutoids, facilitating tissue curvature. This is fundamental to the shaping of the organs during development.

"Scutoid is a prismatoid to which one extra mid-level vertex has been added. This extra vertex forces some of the "faces" of the resulting object to curve. This means that Scutoids are not polyhedra, because not all of their faces are planar. ... For the computational biologists who created/discovered the Scutoid, the key property of the shape is that it can combine with itself and other geometric objects like frustums to create 3D packings of epithelial cells."
- Laura Taalman

Scutellum on heteropteran (no. 26)

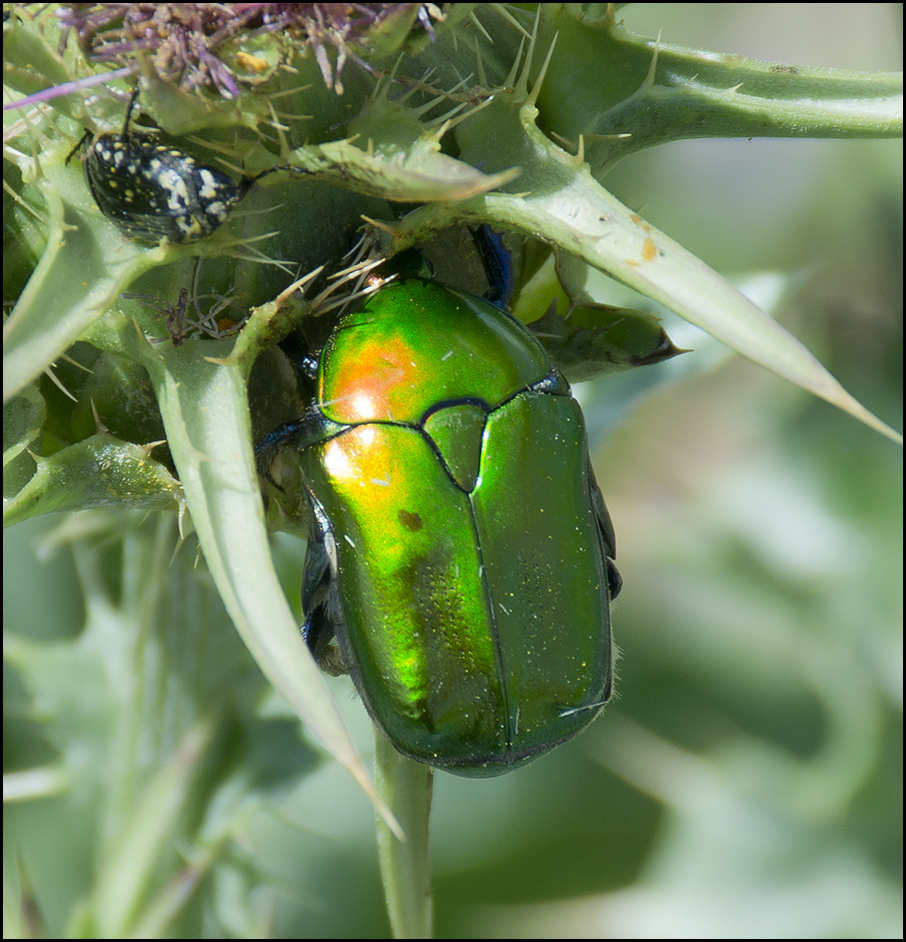
A beetle with a scutellum, for which the shape was officially named.

Cells in the developing lung epithelium have been found to have more complex shapes than the term "scutoid", inspired by the simple scutellum of beetles, suggests. When "scutoids" exhibit multiple Y-shaped connections or vertices along their axis, they have therefore been called "punakoids" instead, as their shape is more reminiscent of the Pancake Rocks in Punakaiki, New Zealand.

== Potential uses ==
The scutoid explains how epithelial cells (the cells that line and protect organs such as the skin) efficiently pack in three dimensions. As epithelial tissue bends or grows, the cells have to take on new shapes to pack together using the least amount of energy possible, and until the scutoid's discovery, it was assumed that epithelial cells packed in mostly frustums, as well as other prism-like shapes. Now, with the knowledge of how epithelial cells pack, it opens up many new possibilities in terms of artificial organs. The scutoid may be applied to making better artificial organs, allowing for things like effective organ replacements, recognizing whether a person's cells are packing correctly or not, and ways to fix that problem.
