= Terminal web =

Structure on the surface of epithelial cells

The terminal web is a structure found at the apical surface of epithelial cells that possess microvilli. It is composed primarily of actin filaments stabilized by spectrin, which also anchors the terminal web to the apical cell membrane. The presence of myosin II and tropomyosin helps to explain the contractile ability of the terminal web. When contracted, the terminal web causes a decrease in diameter of the apex of the cell, causing the microvilli, which are anchored into the terminal web through their stiff actin fibers, to spread apart. This spreading apart of the microvilli aids cells in absorption.
