= Simple cuboidal epithelium =

Tissue type

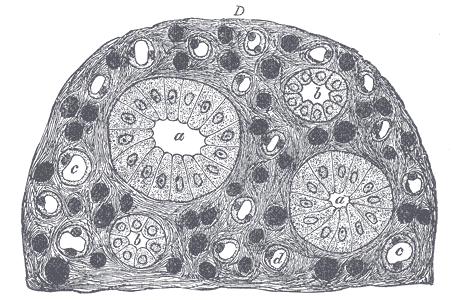
- Simple cuboidal epithelium in the pig kidney. The surfaces of the large and small collecting ducts (a and b), the circular structures, are surrounded by the simple cuboidal epithelium.

Identifiers
- TH: H2.00.02.0.02019
- FMA: 45566

Simple cuboidal epithelium is a type of epithelium that consists of a single layer of cuboidal (cube-like) cells which have large, spherical and central nuclei.

Simple cuboidal epithelium is found on the surface of ovaries, the lining of nephrons, the walls of the renal tubules, parts of the eye and thyroid, and in salivary glands.

On these surfaces, the cells perform secretion and filtration.

== Location ==
Simple cuboidal cells are also found in renal tubules of nephrons, glandular ducts, and thyroid follicles. Simple cuboidal cells are found in single rows with their spherical nuclei in the center of the cells and are directly attached to the basal surface. Simple ciliated cuboidal cells are also present in the respiratory bronchioles. Germinal cuboidal epithelial lines the ovaries and seminiferous tubules of testes. They undergo meiosis to form gametes.

== Functions ==
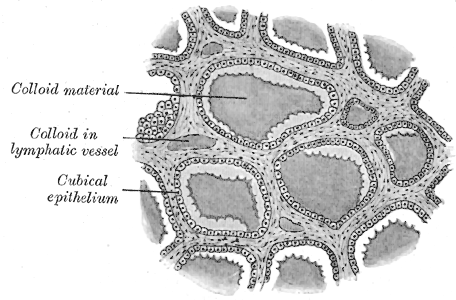
Section of the sheep thyroid gland, with simple cuboidal epithelium (labelled) surrounding thyroid follicles.

These cells provide protection and may be active (pumping material in or out of the lumen) or passive, depending on the location and cellular specialization.

Simple cuboidal epithelium commonly differentiates to form the secretory and duct portions of glands. They also constitute the germinal epithelium, which covers the ovary (but does not contribute to ovum production) and the internal walls of the seminiferous tubules in the male testes. These cells offer some protection and function in filtration and secretion.
