= Pseudostratified columnar epithelium =

Tissue type

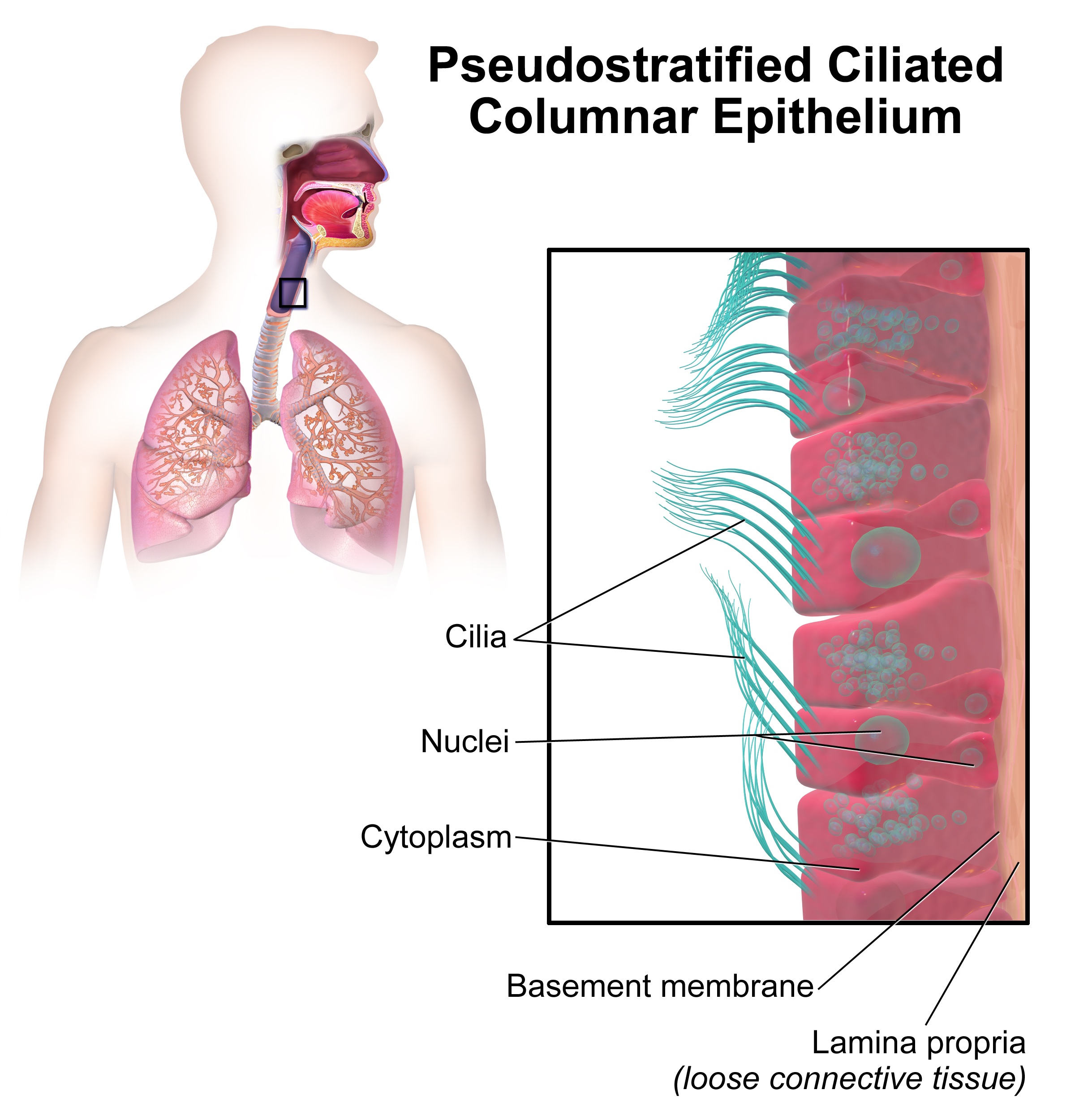
- Illustration depicting ciliated pseudostratified columnar epithelium.

Details
- Function: Epithelium

Identifiers
- TH: H2.00.02.0.02021
- FMA: 45572

Pseudostratified columnar epithelium is a type of epithelium that, though comprising only a single layer of cells, has its cell nuclei positioned in a manner suggestive of stratified columnar epithelium. A stratified epithelium rarely occurs as squamous or cuboidal.

The term pseudostratified is derived from the appearance of this epithelium in the section which conveys the erroneous (pseudo means almost or approaching) impression that there is more than one layer of cells, when in fact this is a true simple epithelium since all the cells rest on the basement membrane. The nuclei of these cells, however, are disposed at different levels, thus creating the illusion of cellular stratification. All cells are not of equal size and not all cells extend to the luminal/apical surface; such cells are capable of cell division providing replacements for cells lost or damaged.

Pseudostratified epithelia function in secretion or absorption. If a specimen looks stratified but has cilia, then it is a pseudostratified ciliated epithelium, since stratified epithelia do not have cilia. Ciliated epithelia are more common and lines the trachea, bronchi. Non-ciliated epithelia lines the larger ducts such as the ducts of parotid glands.

== Examples ==
- Ciliated pseudostratified columnar epithelium is the type of respiratory epithelium found in the linings of the trachea as well as upper respiratory tract, which allows filtering and humidification of incoming air.
- Non-ciliated pseudostratified columnar epithelia are located in the prostate and membranous part of male vas deferens.
- Pseudostratified columnar epithelia with stereocilia are located in the epididymis. Stereocilia of the epididymis are not cilia because their cytoskeleton is composed of actin filaments, not microtubules. They are structurally and molecularly more similar to microvilli than to true cilia.
- Pseudostratified columnar epithelia are found forming the straight, tubular glands of the endometrium in females. They are also found in the internal part of the ear.

== Additional images ==
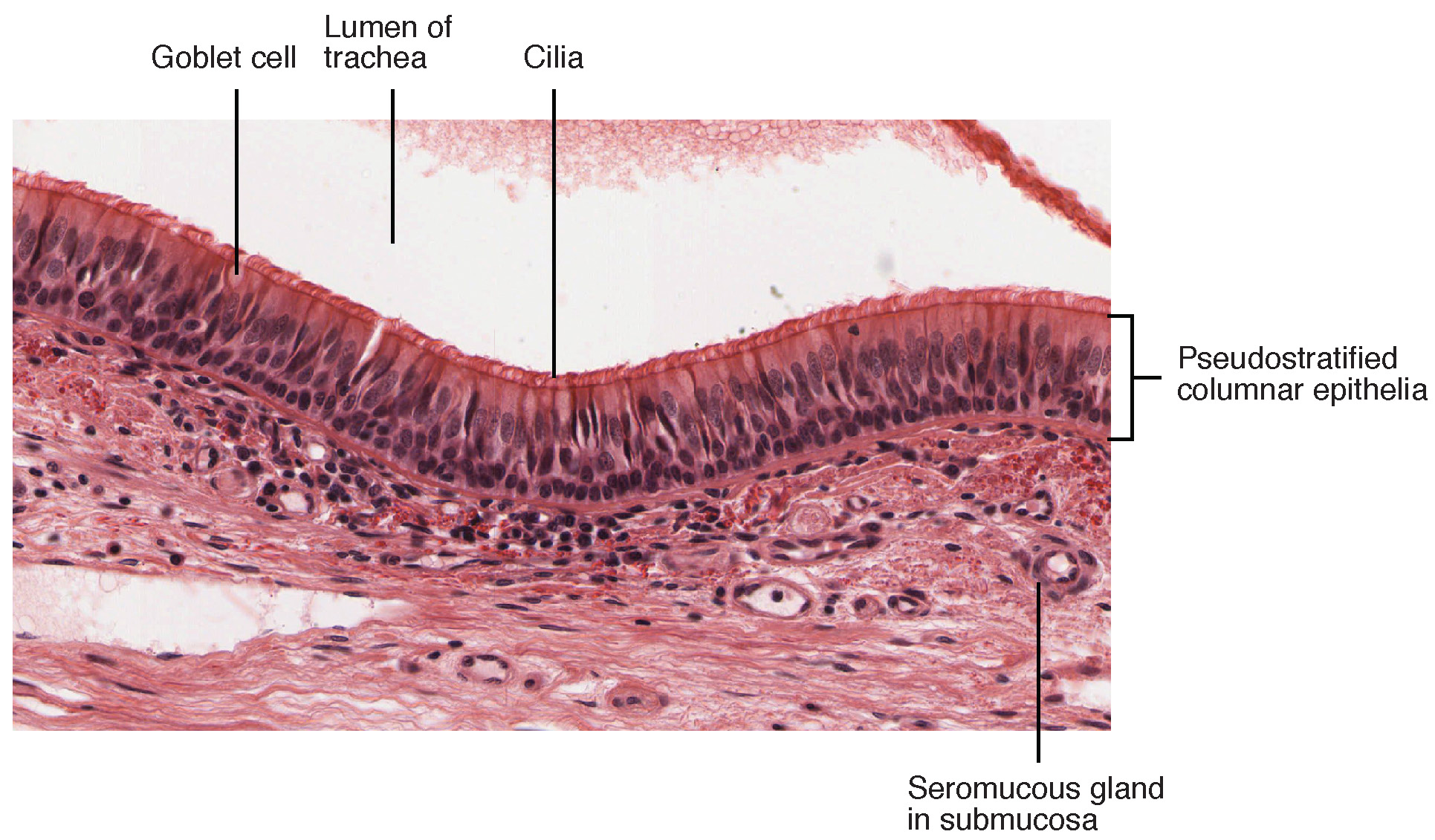
Cross-section of pseudostratified columnar epithelium

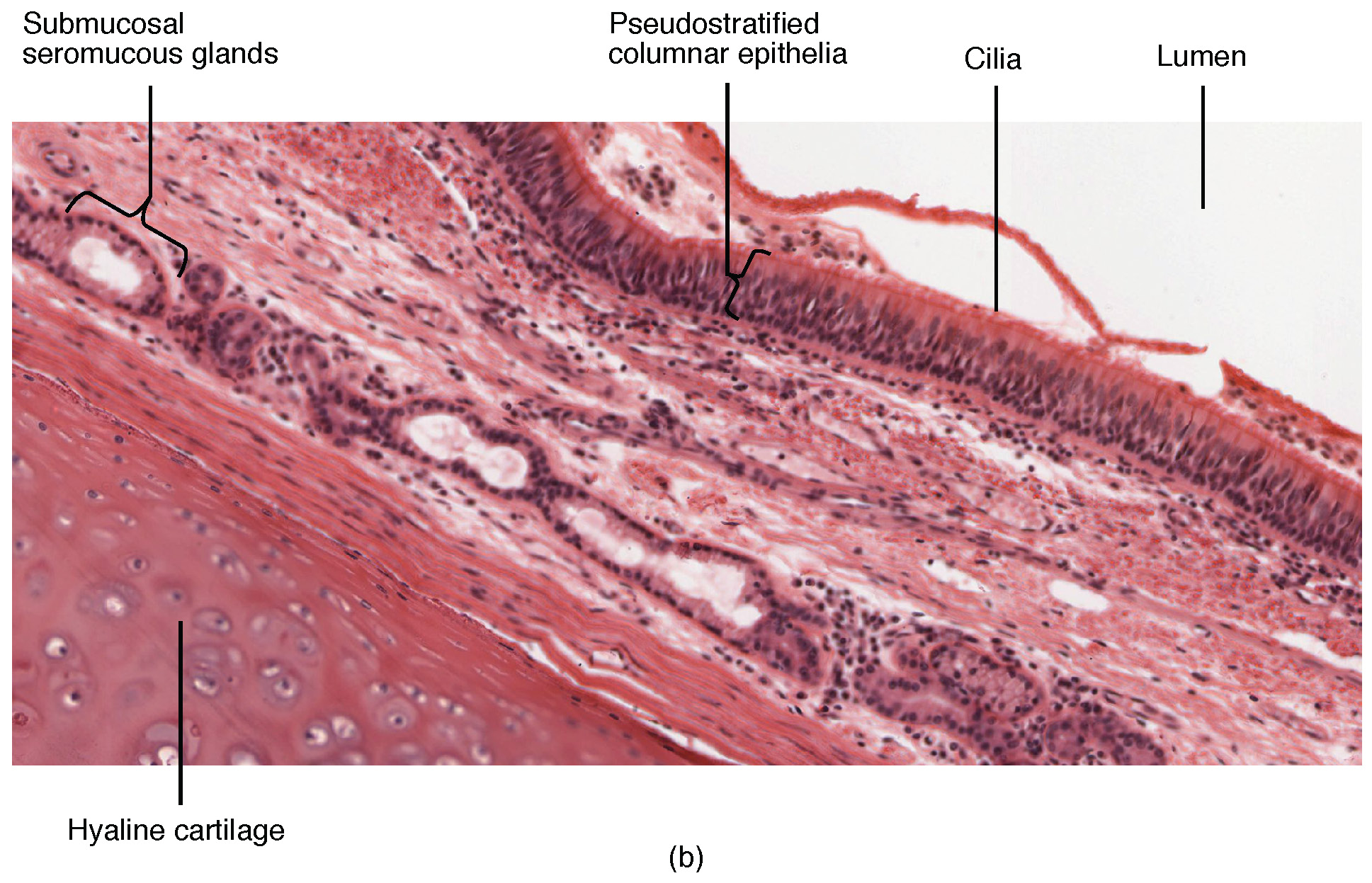
Second cross-section of pseudostratified columnar epithelium

Pseudostratified columnar epithelium, animated image highlights the epithelial cells, goblet cells, then underlying connective tissue
