= Stratified columnar epithelium =

Tissue type

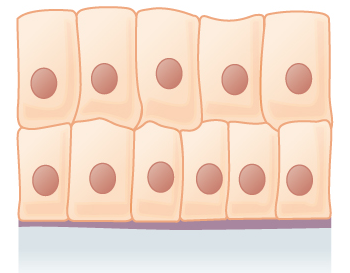

Details
- Shape: several layers; apical cells are columnar shaped

Identifiers
- TH: H2.00.02.0.02032
- FMA: 45564

Stratified columnar epithelium is a rare type of epithelial tissue composed of column-shaped cells arranged in multiple layers. It is found in the conjunctiva, pharynx, anus, and male urethra. It also occurs in the embryo.

== Location ==
Stratified columnar epithelia are found in a variety of locations, including:

- parts of the conjunctiva of the eye
- parts of the pharynx
- anus
- male urethra and vas deferens
- excretory duct of mammary gland and major salivary glands

=== Embryology ===
Stratified columnar epithelium is initially present in parts of the gastrointestinal tract in utero, before being replaced with other types of epithelium. For example, by 8 weeks, it covers the lining of the stomach. By 17 weeks, it is replaced by simple columnar epithelium. This is also found in the fetal esophagus.

== Function ==
The cells function in secretion and protection.

== See also ==
- Pseudostratified columnar epithelium
