= Stratified cuboidal epithelium =

Tissue made of cube-shaped cells

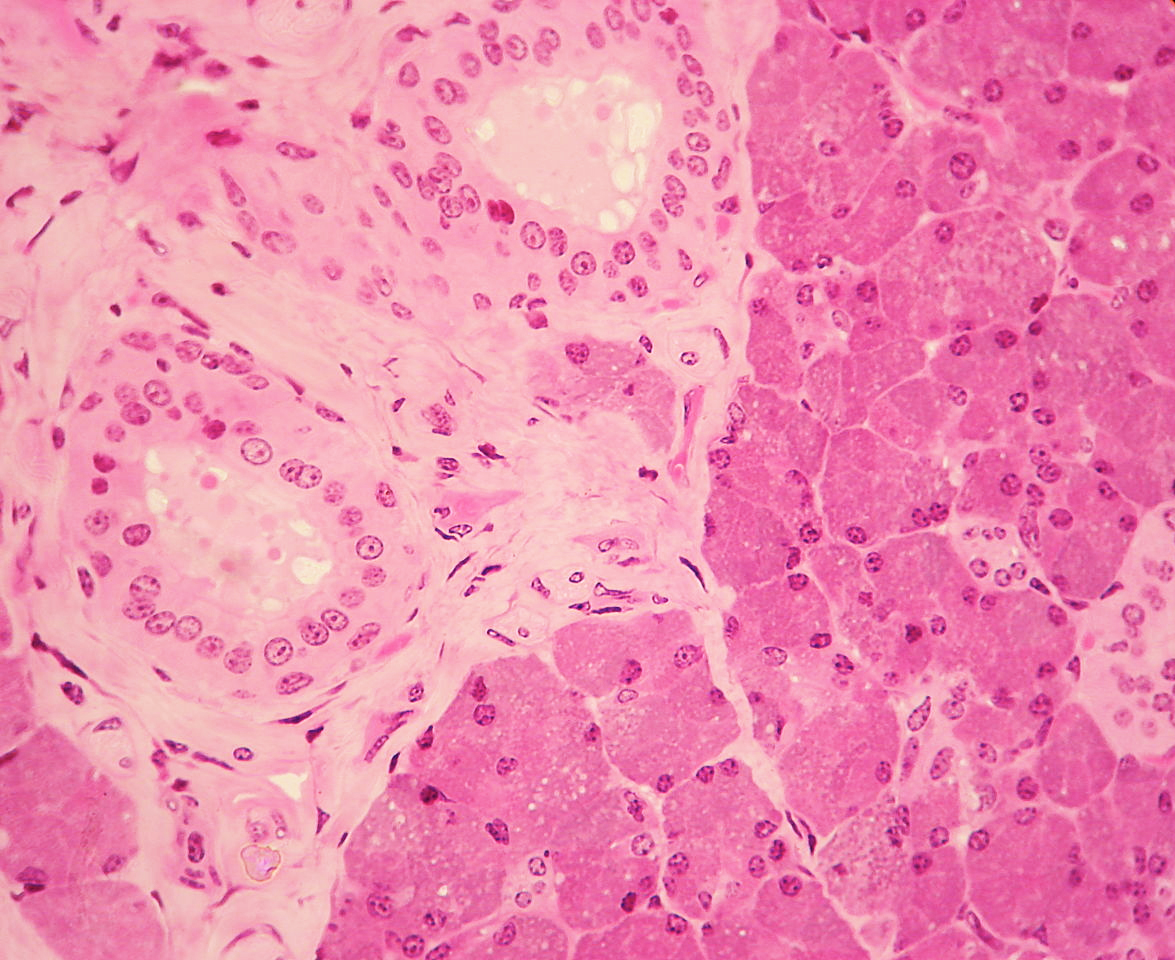
- Stratified cuboidal epithelium in the ducts of the parotid gland, visible as the borders of the two circular structures in the upper left.

Details
- Shape: Many layers of cuboid cells

Identifiers
- Latin: Epithelium stratificatum cuboideum
- TH: H2.00.02.0.02031
- FMA: 63912

Stratified cuboidal epithelium, highlighting the nucleuses, the rest of the epithelial cells, and underlying connective tissue.

Stratified cuboidal epithelium is a type of epithelial tissue composed of multiple layers of cube-shaped cells. Only the most superficial layer is made up of cuboidal cells, and the other layers can be cells of other types. Topmost layer of skin epidermis in frogs, fish is made up of living cuboidal cells.

== Structure ==
This type of tissue can be observed in sweat glands, mammary glands, circumanal glands, and salivary glands. They protect areas such as the ducts of sweat glands, mammary glands, and salivary glands. They are also observed in the linings of urethra.
