= Epithelium =

Tissue lining the surfaces of organs in animals

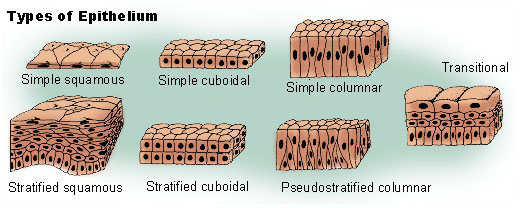
- Types of epithelium

Identifiers
- MeSH: D004848
- TH: H2.00.02.0.00002
- FMA: 9639

Epithelium or epithelial tissue is a thin, continuous, protective layer of cells with little extracellular matrix. An example is the epidermis, the outermost layer of the skin. Epithelial (mesothelial) tissues line the outer surfaces of many internal organs, the corresponding inner surfaces of body cavities, and the inner surfaces of blood vessels. Epithelial tissue is one of the four basic types of animal tissue, along with connective tissue, muscle tissue and nervous tissue. Epithelial tissues lack blood or lymph supply, but are supplied by nerves.

There are three principal shapes of epithelial cell: squamous (scaly), columnar, and cuboidal. These can be arranged in a singular layer of cells, which is known as simple epithelium, as either simple squamous, simple columnar, or simple cuboidal. They can also have layers of two or more cells, known as stratified (layered), or compound, either squamous, columnar or cuboidal. In some tissues, a layer of columnar cells may appear to be stratified due to the placement of the nuclei. This sort of tissue is called pseudostratified. All glands are made up of epithelial cells. Functions of epithelial cells include diffusion, filtration, secretion, selective absorption, germination, and transcellular transport. Compound epithelium has protective functions.

Epithelial layers contain no blood vessels (avascular), so they must receive nourishment via diffusion of substances from the underlying connective tissue, through the basement membrane. Cell junctions are especially abundant in epithelial tissues.

== Classification ==
=== Simple epithelium ===
Simple epithelium is a single layer of cells with every cell in direct contact with the basement membrane that separates it from the underlying connective tissue. In general, it is found where absorption and filtration occur. The thinness of the epithelial barrier facilitates these processes.

In general, epithelial tissues are classified by the number of their layers and by the shape and function of the cells. The basic cell types are squamous, cuboidal, and columnar, classed by their shape.

Type	Description
Squamous	Squamous cells have the appearance of thin, flat plates that can look polygonal when viewed from above. Their name comes from squāma, Latin for "scale" – as on fish or snake skin. The cells fit closely together in tissues, providing a smooth, low-friction surface over which fluids can move easily. The shape of the nucleus usually corresponds to the cell form and helps to identify the type of epithelium. Squamous cells tend to have horizontally flattened, nearly oval-shaped nuclei because of the thin, flattened form of the cell. Squamous epithelium is found lining surfaces such as skin or alveoli in the lung, enabling simple passive diffusion. Specialized squamous epithelium also forms the lining of cavities such as in blood vessels (as endothelium), in the pericardium (as mesothelium), and in other body cavities.
Cuboidal	Cuboidal epithelial cells have a cube-like shape and appear square in cross-section. The cell nucleus is large, spherical and is in the center of the cell. Cuboidal epithelium is commonly found in secretive tissue such as the exocrine glands, or in absorptive tissue such as the pancreas, the lining of the kidney tubules as well as in the ducts of the glands. The germinal epithelium that covers the female ovary, and the germinal epithelium that lines the walls of the seminiferous tubules in the testes are also of the cuboidal type. Cuboidal cells provide protection and may be active in pumping material in or out of the lumen, or passive depending on their location and specialisation. Simple cuboidal epithelium commonly differentiates to form the secretory and duct portions of glands. Stratified cuboidal epithelium protects areas such as the ducts of sweat glands, mammary glands, and salivary glands.
Columnar	Columnar epithelial cells are elongated and column-shaped and have a height of at least four times their width. Their nuclei are elongated and are usually located near the base of the cells. Columnar epithelium forms the lining of the stomach and intestines. The cells here may possess microvilli for maximizing the surface area for absorption, and these microvilli may form a brush border. Other cells may be ciliated to move mucus in the function of mucociliary clearance. Other ciliated cells are found in the fallopian tubes, the uterus and central canal of the spinal cord. Some columnar cells are specialized for sensory reception such as in the nose, ears and the taste buds. Hair cells in the inner ears have stereocilia which are similar to microvilli. Goblet cells are modified columnar cells and are found between the columnar epithelial cells of the duodenum. They secrete mucus, which acts as a lubricant. Single-layered non-ciliated columnar epithelium tends to indicate an absorptive function. Stratified columnar epithelium is rare but is found in lobar ducts in the salivary glands, the eye, the pharynx, and sex organs. This consists of a layer of cells resting on at least one other layer of epithelial cells, which can be squamous, cuboidal, or columnar.
Pseudostratified	These are simple columnar epithelial cells whose nuclei appear at different heights, giving the misleading (hence "pseudo") impression that the epithelium is stratified when the cells are viewed in cross section. Ciliated pseudostratified epithelial cells have cilia. Cilia are capable of energy-dependent pulsatile beating in a certain direction through interaction of cytoskeletal microtubules and connecting structural proteins and enzymes. In the respiratory tract, the wafting effect produced causes mucus secreted locally by the goblet cells (to lubricate and to trap pathogens and particles) to flow in that direction (typically out of the body). Ciliated epithelium is found in the airways (nose, bronchi), but is also found in the uterus and fallopian tubes, where the cilia propel the ovum to the uterus.

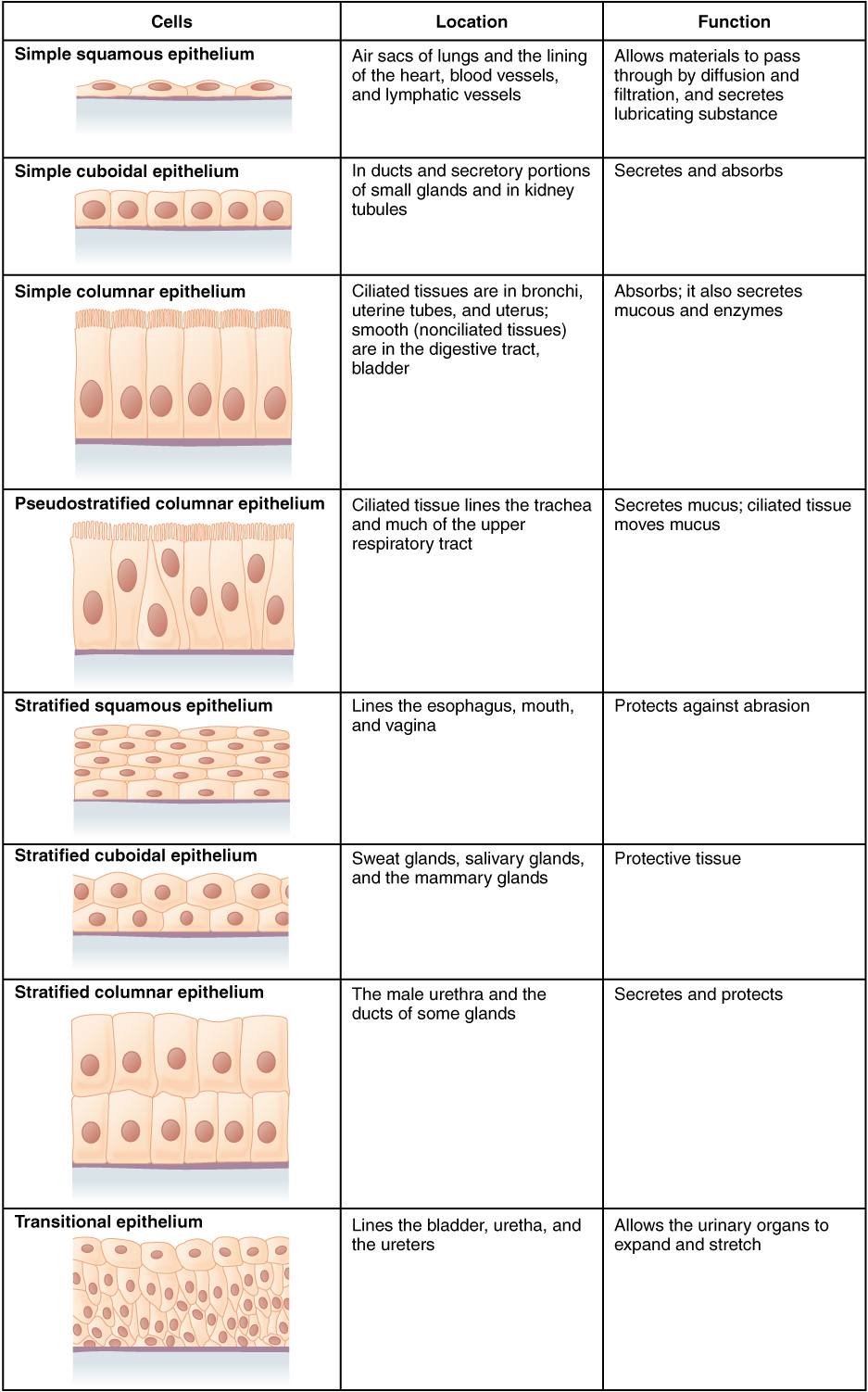
Summary showing different epithelial cells/tissues and their characteristics

By layer, epithelium is classed as either simple epithelium, only one cell thick (unilayered), or stratified epithelium having two or more cells in thickness, or multi-layered – as stratified squamous epithelium, stratified cuboidal epithelium, and stratified columnar epithelium, and both types of layering can be made up of any of the cell shapes. However, when taller simple columnar epithelial cells are viewed in cross section showing several nuclei appearing at different heights, they can be confused with stratified epithelia. This kind of epithelium is therefore described as pseudostratified columnar epithelium.

Transitional epithelium has cells that can change from squamous to cuboidal, depending on the amount of tension on the epithelium.

=== Stratified epithelium ===
Stratified or compound epithelium differs from simple epithelium in that it is multilayered. It is therefore found where body linings have to withstand mechanical or chemical insult such that layers can be abraded and lost without exposing subepithelial layers. Cells flatten as the layers become more apical, though in their most basal layers, the cells can be squamous, cuboidal, or columnar.

Stratified epithelia (of columnar, cuboidal, or squamous type) can have the following specializations:

Specialization	Description
Keratinized	In this particular case, the most apical layers (exterior) of cells are dead and lose their nucleus and cytoplasm, instead contain a tough, resistant protein called keratin. This specialization makes the epithelium somewhat water-resistant, so is found in the mammalian skin. The lining of the oesophagus is an example of a non-keratinized or "moist" stratified epithelium.
Parakeratinized	In this case, the most apical layers of cells are filled with keratin, but they still retain their nuclei. These nuclei are pyknotic, meaning that they are highly condensed. Parakeratinized epithelium is sometimes found in the oral mucosa and in the upper regions of the oesophagus.
Transitional	Transitional epithelia are found in tissues that stretch, and it can appear to be stratified cuboidal when the tissue is relaxed, or stratified squamous when the organ is distended and the tissue stretches. It is sometimes called urothelium since it is almost exclusively found in the bladder, ureters and urethra.

== Structure ==
Epithelial tissue cells can adopt shapes of varying complexity from polyhedral to scutoidal to punakoidal. They are tightly packed and form a continuous sheet with almost no intercellular spaces. All epithelia is usually separated from underlying tissues by an extracellular fibrous basement membrane.

The lining of the mouth, lung alveoli and kidney tubules are all made of epithelial tissue. The lining of the blood and lymphatic vessels are of a specialised form of epithelium called endothelium.

=== Location ===
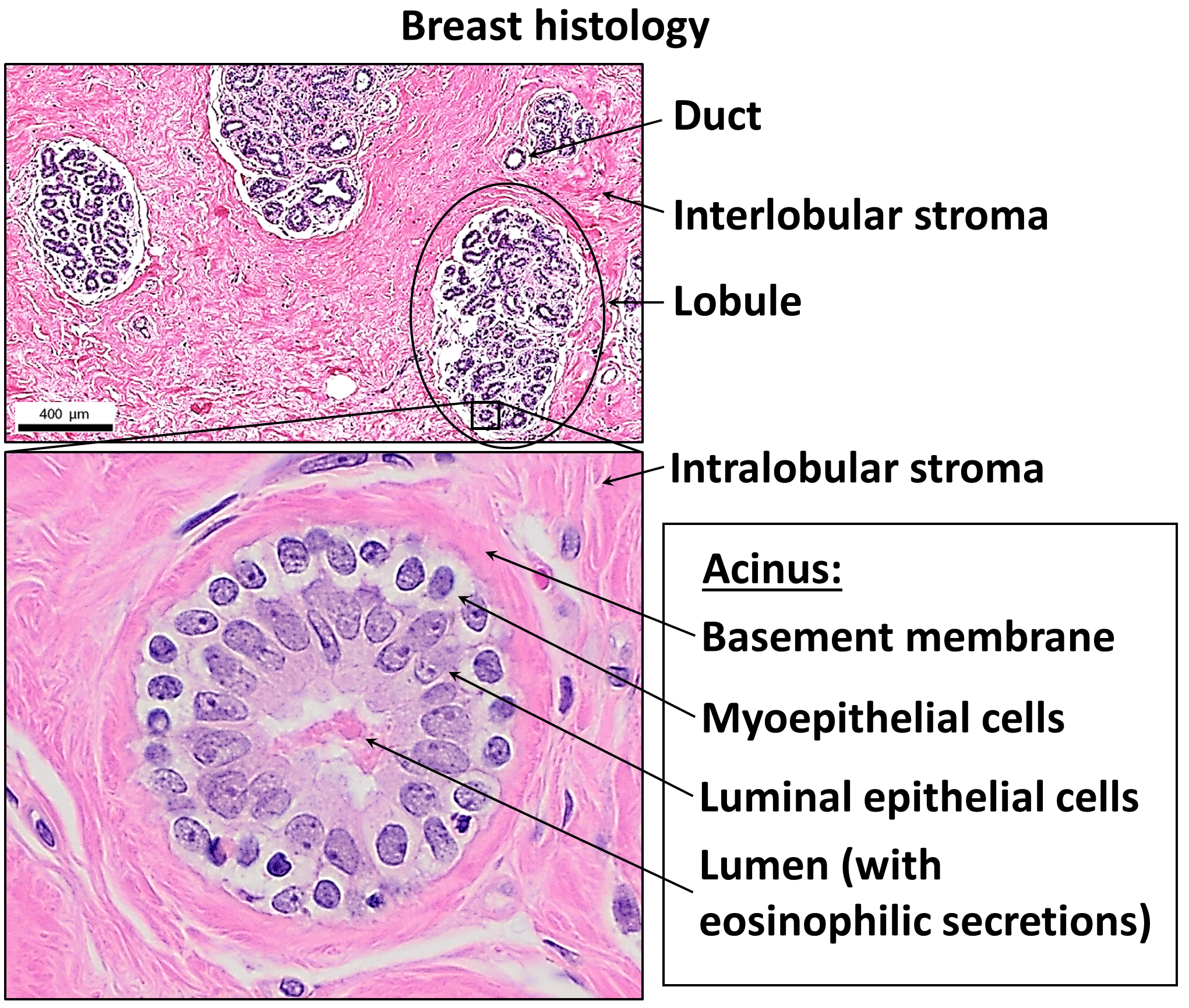
Normal histology of the breast, with luminal epithelial cells annotated near bottom right

Epithelium lines both the outside (skin) and the inside cavities and lumina of bodies. The outermost layer of human skin is composed of dead stratified squamous, keratinized epithelial cells.

Tissues that line the inside of the mouth, the esophagus, the vagina, and part of the rectum are composed of nonkeratinized stratified squamous epithelium. Other surfaces that separate body cavities from the outside environment are lined by simple squamous, columnar, or pseudostratified epithelial cells. Other epithelial cells line the insides of the lungs, the gastrointestinal tract, the reproductive and urinary tracts, and make up the exocrine and endocrine glands. The outer surface of the cornea is covered with fast-growing, easily regenerated epithelial cells. A specialised form of epithelium, endothelium, forms the inner lining of blood vessels and the heart, and is known as vascular endothelium, and lining lymphatic vessels as lymphatic endothelium. Another type, mesothelium, forms the walls of the pericardium, pleurae, and peritoneum.

In arthropods, the integument, or external "skin", consists of a single layer of epithelial ectoderm from which arises the cuticle, an outer covering of chitin, the rigidity of which varies as per its chemical composition.

=== Basement membrane ===
The basal surface of epithelial tissue rests on a basement membrane and the free/apical surface faces body fluid or outside. The basement membrane acts as a scaffolding on which epithelium can grow and regenerate after injuries. Epithelial tissue has a nerve supply, but no blood supply and must be nourished by substances diffusing from the blood vessels in the underlying tissue. The basement membrane acts as a selectively permeable membrane that determines which substances will be able to enter the epithelium.

The basal lamina is made up of laminin (glycoproteins) secreted by epithelial cells. The reticular lamina beneath the basal lamina is made up of collagen proteins secreted by connective tissue.

=== Cell junctions ===
Cell junctions are especially abundant in epithelial tissues. They regulate interactions between neighbouring cells or between a cell and the extracellular matrix or contribute to the paracellular barrier of epithelia and regulate paracellular transport.

There are 5 main types of cell junctions, each composed of different protein complexes:

- Tight junctions are a formed by pairs of trans-membrane proteins that form a seal to prevent water or solutes from leaking between cells.
- Adherens junctions allow the cytoskeletal microfilaments of adjacent cells to interact with one another.
- Desmosomes allow cells to form strong attachments to one another by connecting cadherins and intermediate filaments.
- Hemidesmosomes resemble desmosomes but mediate cellular attachment to extracellular matrix. They use integrins instead of cadherins.
- Gap junctions connect the cytoplasm of adjacent cells and are made up of proteins called connexins (six of which come together to make a connexion).

=== Development ===
Epithelial tissues are derived from all of the embryological germ layers:

- from ectoderm (e.g., the epidermis);
- from endoderm (e.g., the lining of the gastrointestinal tract);
- from mesoderm (e.g., the inner linings of body cavities).

However, pathologists do not consider endothelium and mesothelium (both derived from mesoderm) to be true epithelium. This is because such tissues present very different pathology. For that reason, pathologists label cancers in endothelium and mesothelium sarcomas, whereas true epithelial cancers are called carcinomas. Additionally, the filaments that support these mesoderm-derived tissues are very distinct. Outside of the field of pathology, it is generally accepted that the epithelium arises from all three germ layers.

=== Cell turnover ===
Epithelia turn over at some of the fastest rates in the body. For epithelial layers to maintain constant cell numbers essential to their functions, the number of cells that divide must match those that die. They do this mechanically. If there are too few of the cells, the stretch that they experience rapidly activates cell division. Alternatively, when too many cells accumulate, crowding triggers their death by activation epithelial cell extrusion. Here, cells fated for elimination are seamlessly squeezed out by contracting a band of actin and myosin around and below the cell, preventing any gaps from forming that could disrupt their barriers. Failure to do so can result in aggressive tumors and their invasion by aberrant basal cell extrusion.

== Functions ==
Forms of secretion in glandular tissue

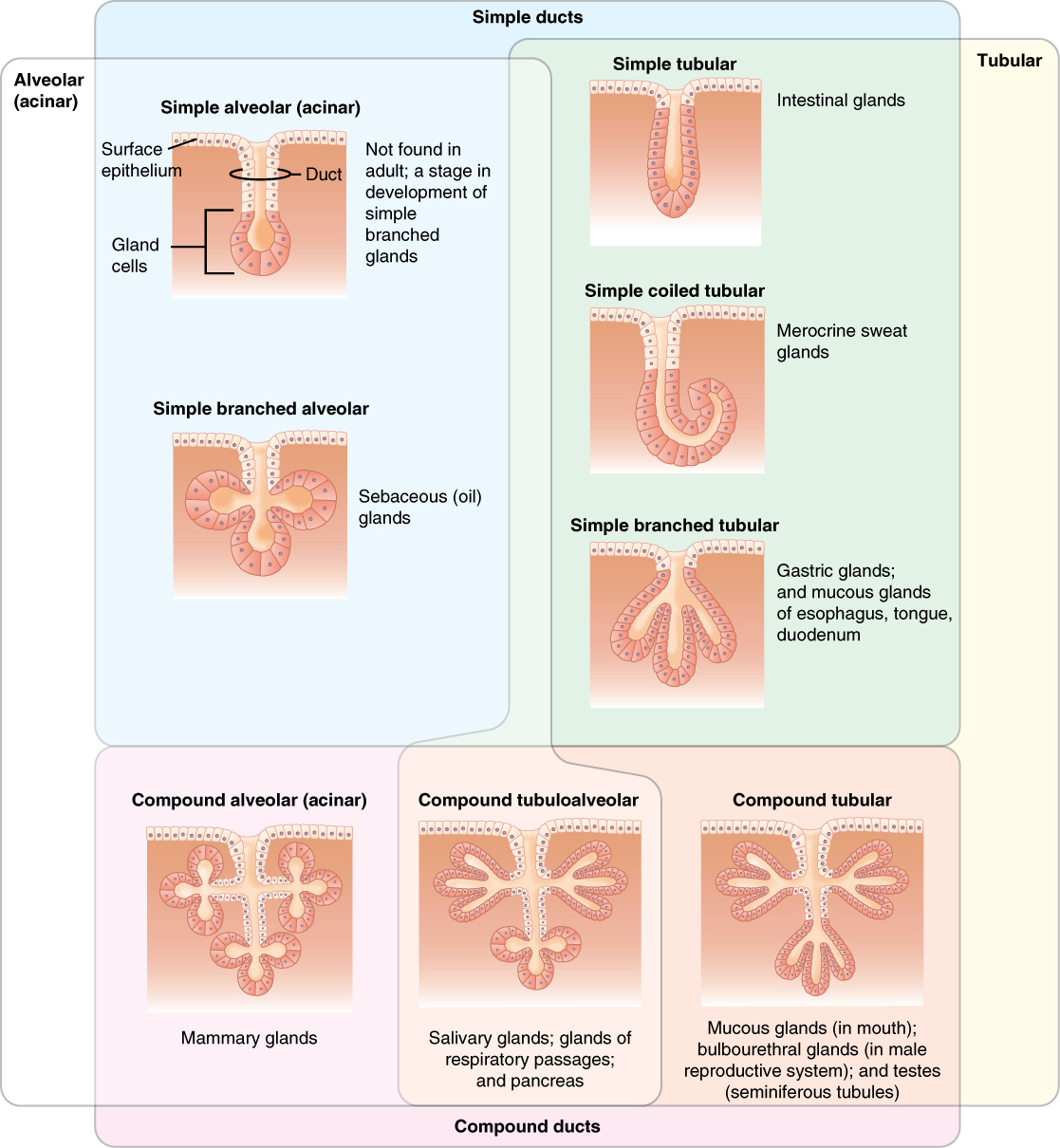
Different characteristics of glands of the body

Epithelial tissues have as their primary functions:

1. to protect the tissues that lie beneath from radiation, desiccation, toxins, invasion by pathogens, and physical trauma
2. the regulation and exchange of chemicals between the underlying tissues and a body cavity
3. the secretion of hormones into the circulatory system, as well as the secretion of sweat, mucus, enzymes, and other products that are delivered by ducts
4. to provide sensation
5. Absorb water and digested food in the lining of digestive canal.

=== Glandular tissue ===
Glandular tissue is the type of epithelium that forms the glands from the infolding of epithelium and subsequent growth in the underlying connective tissue. They may be specialized columnar or cuboidal tissues consisting of goblet cells, which secrete mucus. Several glands contain myoepithelial cells that help in the contraction needed for secretion. There are two major classifications of glands: endocrine glands and exocrine glands:

- Endocrine glands secrete their product into the extracellular space where it is rapidly taken up by the circulatory system.
- Exocrine glands secrete their products into a duct that then delivers the product to the lumen of an organ or onto the free surface of the epithelium. Their secretions include tears, saliva, oil (sebum), enzyme, digestive juices, sweat.

=== Sensing the extracellular environment ===
"Some epithelial cells are ciliated, especially in respiratory epithelium, and they commonly exist as a sheet of polarised cells forming a tube or tubule with cilia projecting into the lumen." Primary cilia on epithelial cells provide chemosensation, thermoception, and mechanosensation of the extracellular environment by playing "a sensory role mediating specific signalling cues, including soluble factors in the external cell environment, a secretory role in which a soluble protein is released to have an effect downstream of the fluid flow, and mediation of fluid flow if the cilia are motile."

=== Host immune response ===
Epithelial cells express many genes that encode immune mediators and proteins involved in cell-cell communication with hematopoietic immune cells. The resulting immune functions of these non-hematopoietic, structural cells contribute to the mammalian immune system ("structural immunity"). Relevant aspects of the epithelial cell response to infections are encoded in the epigenome of these cells, which enables a rapid response to immunological challenges.

== Clinical significance ==
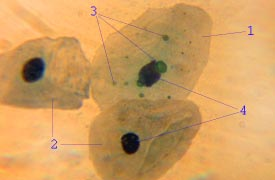
Epithelial cell infected with Chlamydia pneumoniae

The slide shows at (1) an epithelial cell infected by Chlamydia pneumoniae; their inclusion bodies shown at (3); an uninfected cell shown at (2) and (4) showing the difference between an infected cell nucleus and an uninfected cell nucleus.

Epithelium grown in culture can be identified by examining its morphological characteristics. Epithelial cells tend to cluster together, and have a "characteristic tight pavement-like appearance". But this is not always the case, such as when the cells are derived from a tumor. In these cases, it is often necessary to use certain biochemical markers to make a positive identification. The intermediate filament proteins in the cytokeratin group are almost exclusively found in epithelial cells, so they are often used for this purpose.

Cancers originating from the epithelium are classified as carcinomas. In contrast, sarcomas develop in connective tissue.

When epithelial cells or tissues are damaged from cystic fibrosis, sweat glands are also damaged, causing a frosty coating of the skin.

== Etymology and pronunciation ==
The word epithelium uses the Greek roots ἐπί (epi), "on" or "upon", and θηλή (thēlē), "nipple". Epithelium is so called because the name was originally used to describe the translucent covering of small "nipples" of tissue on the lip. The word has both mass and count senses; the plural form is epithelia.

== Additional images ==
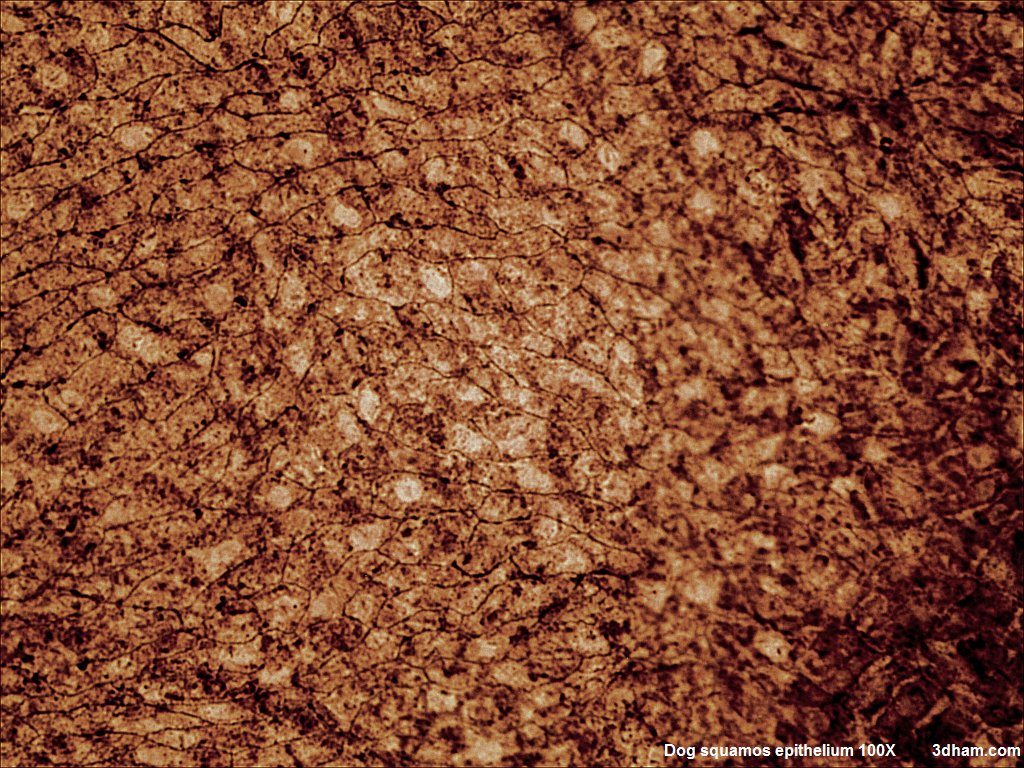
Squamous epithelium 100×

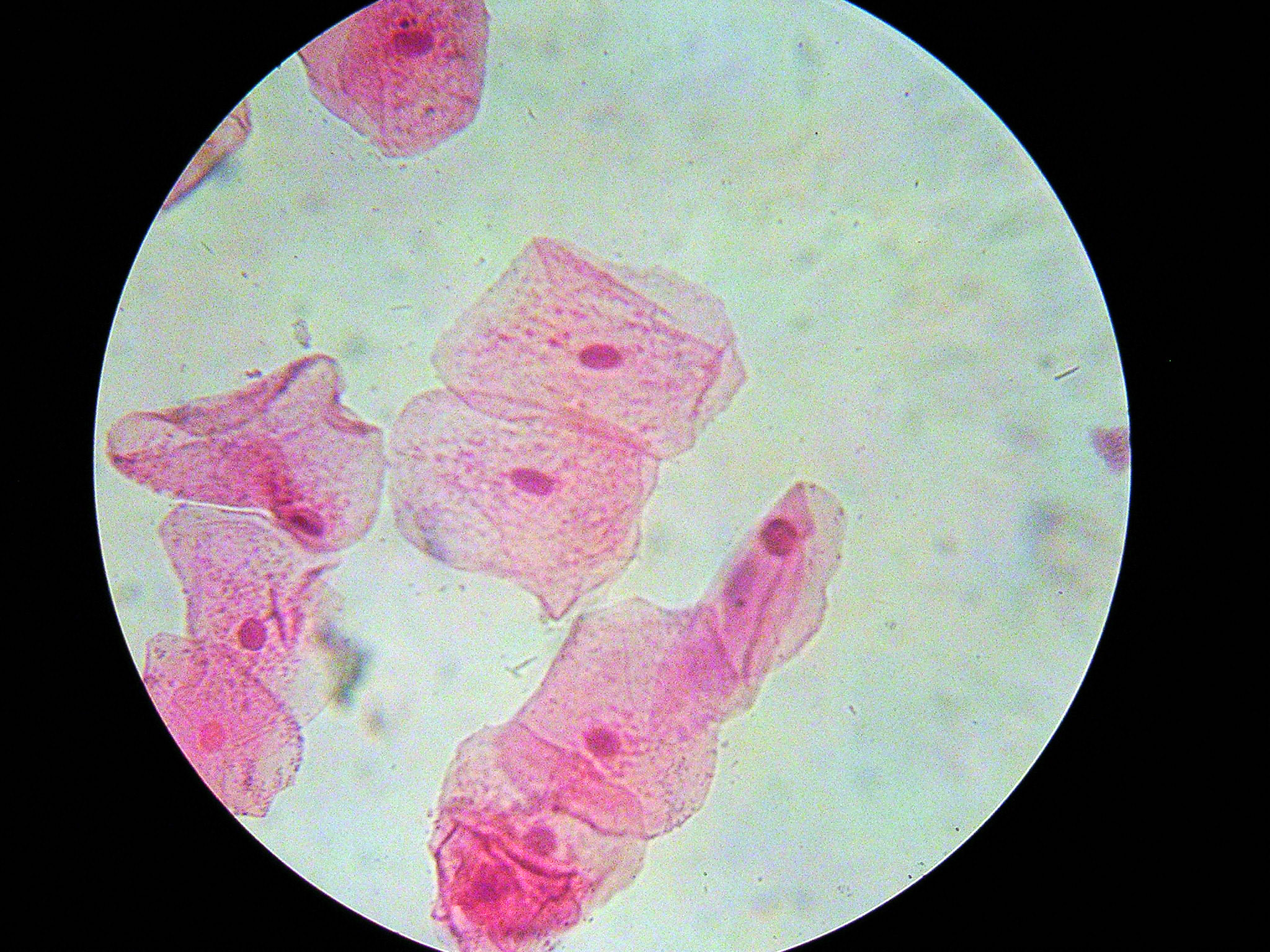
Human cheek cells (nonkeratinized stratified squamous epithelium) 500×

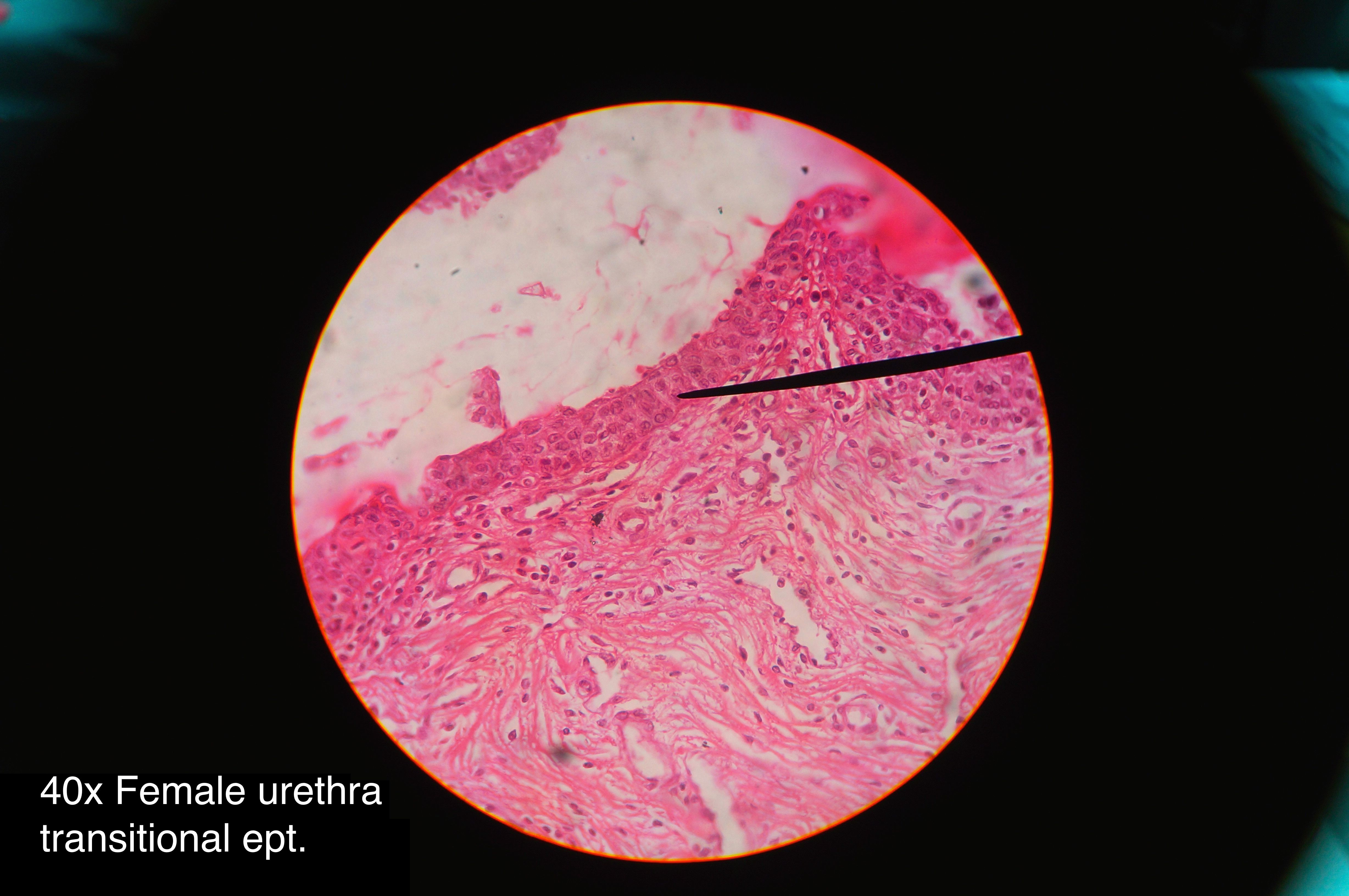
Histology of female urethra showing transitional epithelium

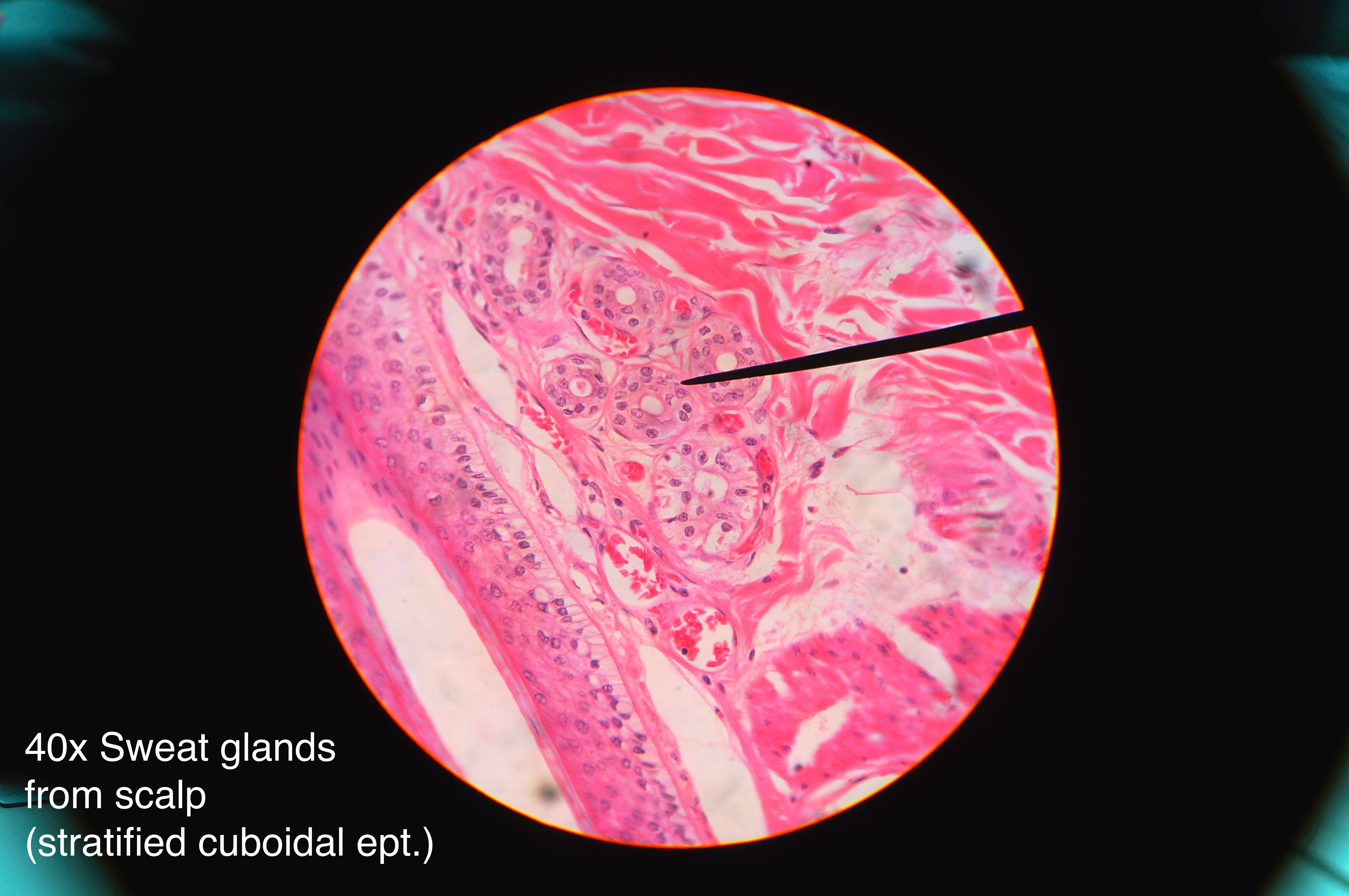
Histology of sweat gland showing stratified cuboidal epithelium

== See also ==
- Dark cell
- Epithelial-mesenchymal transition
- Epithelial polarity
- Glycocalyx
- Inner and outer enamel epithelium
- Iris pigment epithelium
- Neuroepithelial cell
- Retinal pigment epithelium
- Skin cancer
- Sulcular epithelium
- List of distinct cell types in the adult human body
