= Mucin =

Glycoprotein

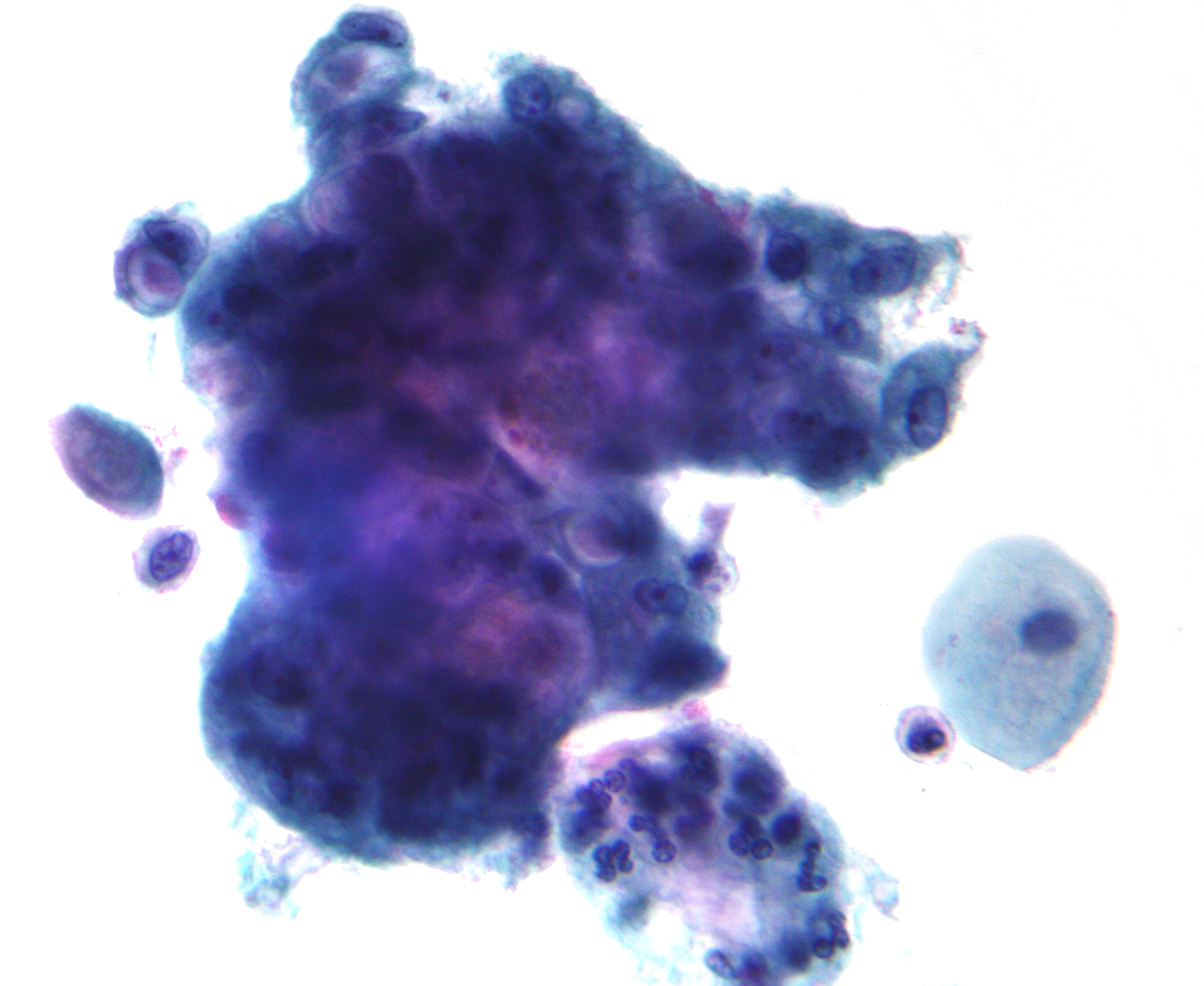
- Micrograph showing cells with prominent mucin-containing intracytoplasmic vacuoles. Pap stain.

Identifiers
- Symbol: Mucin
- Membranome: 111

Mucins (/ˈmjuːsɪn/) are a family of high molecular weight, heavily glycosylated proteins (glycoconjugates) produced by epithelial tissues in most animals. Mucins are distinguished between membrane-bound mucins, forming the glycocalyx, or secreted mucins, forming mucus-gels. These mucus gels cover the wet epithelium, serving functions from lubrication (as seen e.g. in the eyes), to physico-chemical barrier formation, protecting against foreign particles and pathogens as seen in e.g. the lungs or intestine. Next to their physical properties, gel-forming and transmembrane mucins alike are also involved in cell signalling and immune responses. They often take an inhibitory role. Some mucins are associated with controlling mineralization, including nacre formation in mollusks, calcification in echinoderms and bone formation in vertebrates.

Besides their physicochemical barrier properties, mucins have been reported to function as receptors for various pathogens, facilitating their invasion into host cells. Thus they display a dual role in host defence, which is currently under investigation.

Dysregulation of mucin expression and secretion is closely associated with various diseases. Overexpression of the mucin proteins, especially MUC1, is associated with many types of cancer. An impaired mucus barrier integrity, showing decreased mucus layer thickness and, or increased permeability are closely linked to e.g. Crohn's disease and Ulcerative colitis.

== Human mucins ==
Human mucins include genes with the HUGO symbol MUC 1 through 22. Of these mucins, the following classes have been defined by localization:

- Secreted mucins in humans, with their chromosomal location, repeat size in amino acids (aa), whether they are gel-forming (Y) or not (N), and their tissue expression.

| Mucin | gel | chromosome | repeat size (aa) | tissue expression |
|---|---|---|---|---|
| MUC2 | Y | 11p15.5 | 23 | Jejunum, ileum, colon, endometrium |
| MUC5AC | Y | 11p15.5 | 8 | Respiratory tract, stomach, conjunctiva, endocervix, endometrium |
| MUC5B | Y | 11p15.5 | 29 | Respiratory tract, submandibular glands, endocervix |
| MUC6 | Y | 11p15.5 | 169 | Stomach, ileum, gall bladder, endocervix, endometrium |
| MUC19 | Y | 12q12 | 19 | corneal and conjunctival epithelia; lacrimal gland |
| MUC7 | N | 4q13–q21 | 23 | Sublingual and submandibular glands |
| MUC8 | N | 12q24.3 | 13/41 | Respiratory tract, uterus, endocervix, endometrium |
| MUC9 | N | 1p13 | 15 | Fallopian tubes |
| MUC20 | N | 3 | 19 | kidney (high), moderately in placenta, lung, prostate, liver, digestive system |

- Membrane-bound (transmembrane) mucins: MUC1, MUC3A, MUC3B, MUC4, MUC12, MUC13, MUC15, MUC16, MUC17, MUC21 (formerly C6orf205), MUC22 (highly polymorphic)

The major secreted airway mucins are MUC5AC and MUC5B, while MUC2 is secreted mostly in the intestine but also in the airway. MUC7, MUC5B, and MUC19 are the main salivary mucins.

== Protein structure ==
Mature mammalian mucins are composed of two distinct regions:

- The amino- and carboxy-terminal regions are very lightly glycosylated, but rich in cysteines. The cysteine residues participate in establishing disulfide linkages within and among mucin monomers.
- A large central region ("PTS domain") formed of multiple tandem repeats of 10 to 80 residue sequences in which up to half of the amino acids are serine or threonine. This area becomes saturated with hundreds of O-linked oligosaccharides. N-linked oligosaccharides are also found on mucins, but in less abundance than O-linked sugars.

== Evolutionary classification ==
The functional classification does not correspond to an exact evolutionary relationship, which is still incomplete and ongoing. Known-related groups include:

- The gel-forming mucins (2, 5AC, 5B, 6, 19) are related both to each other and to otogelin and von Willebrand Factor (PTHR11339). Four of these occur in a well-conserved gene cluster (at 11p15.5 in humans).
- The EGF-like domain containing mucins. These include MUC3(A,B), MUC4, MUC12, MUC13, and MUC17.
- Some EGF-like mucins, plus MUC1 and MUC16, carry SEA domains, a vertebrate invention. It is unclear whether this points to a common origin among these transmembrane mucins.
- MUC21 and MUC22 are related to each other by sharing a C-terminal domain (PF14654). They also occur in a human gene cluster on 6p21.33.
- MUC7 is a recent invention in placental mammals. It started as a copy in the secretory calcium-binding phosphoprotein (SCPP) gene cluster and rapidly gained PTS repeats.

== Function in humans ==
Mucins have been found to have important functions in defense against bacterial and fungal infections. MUC5B, the predominant mucin in the mouth and female genital tract, has been shown to significantly reduce attachment and biofilm formation of Streptococcus mutans, a bacterium with the potential to form cavities. Unusually, MUC5B does not kill the bacteria but rather maintains it in the planktonic (non-biofilm) phase, thus maintaining a diverse and healthy oral microbiome. Similar effects of MUC5B and other mucins have been demonstrated with other pathogens, such as Candida albicans, Helicobacter pylori, and even HIV. In the mouth, mucins can also recruit anti-microbial proteins such as statherins and histatine 1, which further reduces risk of infection.

Eleven mucins are expressed by the eye surface epithelia, goblet cells and associated glands, even though most of them are expressed at very low levels. They maintain wetness, lubricate the blink, stabilize the tear film, and create a physical barrier to the outside world.

== Glycosylation and aggregation ==
Mucin genes encode mucin monomers that are synthesized as rod-shaped apomucin cores that are post-translationally modified by exceptionally abundant O-GalNac glycosylation.

The dense "sugar coating" of mucins gives them considerable water-holding capacity and also makes them resistant to proteolysis, which may be important in maintaining mucosal barriers.

Mucins are secreted as massive aggregates of proteins with molecular masses of roughly 1 to 10 million Da. Within these aggregates, monomers are linked to one another mostly by non-covalent interactions, although intermolecular disulfide bonds may also play a role in this process.

== Secretion ==
Upon stimulation, MARCKS (myristylated alanine-rich C kinase substrate) protein coordinates the secretion of mucin from mucin-filled vesicles within the specialized epithelial cells. Fusion of the vesicles to the plasma membrane causes release of the mucin, which as it exchanges Ca^{2+} for Na^{+} expands up to 600 fold. The result is a viscoelastic product of interwoven molecules which, combined with other secretions (e.g., from the airway epithelium and the submucosal glands in the respiratory system), is called mucus.

== Clinical significance ==
Increased mucin production occurs in many adenocarcinomas, including cancers of the pancreas, lung, breast, ovary, colon and other tissues. Mucins are also overexpressed in lung diseases such as asthma, bronchitis, chronic obstructive pulmonary disease (COPD) or cystic fibrosis. Two membrane mucins, MUC1 and MUC4 have been extensively studied in relation to their pathological implication in the disease process. Mucins are under investigation as possible diagnostic markers for malignancies and other disease processes in which they are most commonly over- or mis-expressed.

Abnormal deposits of mucin are responsible for the non-pitting facial edema seen in untreated hypothyroidism. This edema is seen in the pretibial area as well.

== Non-vertebrate mucins ==
Beyond the better-studied vertebrate mucins, other animals also express (not necessarily related) proteins with similar properties. These include:

- Drosophila is known to express mucin proteins containing PTS-rich repeats.
- Trypanosoma cruzi express cell-surface mucins (Pfam PF01456).

Some other organisms produce mucilage that does not have a protein component, only polysacchides.

== Cosmetic use ==
=== Functional properties ===
Mucins are high molecular weight proteins that have been heavily glycosylated (> 70% carbohydrate) and hence, are often used in cosmetic products for their humidifying, barrier-protecting, and skin-conditioning properties.

The abundant carbohydrate side chains of the glycoproteins enable the structure to bind a large amount of water and form viscous, gel-like networks. This structural property is what gives mucins the ability to create a hydrated barrier over the skin, enhancing moisture retention and providing a lubricated feel upon application. Additionally, mucus extracts from animals can also contain bioactive contaminant components, such as glycosaminoglycans and trace minerals, which are associated with skin repair and regeneration.

The molecular weight (MW) of mucin can influence the functional behavior of topical formulations in which it is found. Higher MW mucins tend to remain on the skin surface, contributing to film formation and barrier protection. This protective layer of mucin can reduce transepidermal water loss. Lower MW mucins, on the other hand, can more easily penetrate the stratum corneum, or the outermost layer of the epidermis. This enhances the hydrating effects, allowing the mucins and their water networks to interact with more layers of the skin. Hence, variations in mucin MW can be fine-tuned according to desired product goals.

Mucus extracts contain compounds that exhibit antioxidant activity, including peptides and trace minerals that can neutralize reactive oxygen species (ROS), which are detrimental to the inner and external environment of the body. By reducing oxidative stress, these components can contribute to the prevention of cellular damage associated with environmental factors such as ultraviolet (UV) damage and pollution. This antioxidative nature of mucins is often pinpointed as a contributing factor to anti-aging effects and the smoothening of rough skin.

=== Derivations of mucin for cosmetic use ===
Mucin-derived materials, particularly from snail mucus, have been incorporated into cosmetic formulations due to their film-forming and water-retention behavior, which enables formation of a protective surface layer that can reduce transepidermal water loss and improve skin hydration.

Snail mucin, commonly obtained from species such as Helix aspersa Müller and Helix aspersa var. maxima, is the most widely used source in cosmetic products, including creams, serums, and masks. In vitro studies have demonstrated that snail mucus can promote fibroblast survival, proliferation, and migration, suggesting a potential role in skin repair processes. Systematic reviews of snail-based products report improvements in hydration, texture, and irritation, although the strength of clinical evidence remains variable.

Mucin from other sources, including fish such as mackerel, has also been investigated for cosmetic applications. Fish mucus hydrolysates have demonstrated antioxidant activity, with amino acid components such as L-methionine and L-histidine contributing to reactive oxygen species scavenging. Antioxidant capacity in these materials is commonly evaluated using assays such as oxygen radical absorbance capacity and Trolox equivalent antioxidant capacity.

The properties of mucin used in cosmetic applications can vary depending on biological and environmental factors, including species and stress conditions, which have been shown to influence mucus composition. Extraction methods also affect material quality; traditional techniques often rely on mechanical or chemical stimulation, while more recent approaches emphasize low-stress collection to improve consistency and sustainability.

Research into synthetic or bioengineered mucin-like materials has focused on developing chemically defined glycopolymers, peptides, and polymer-based systems that mimic key functional properties of native mucins, including hydration, lubrication, barrier formation, and viscoelastic behavior. These mucin-mimetic materials are designed to overcome the variability and heterogeneity of naturally derived mucins while preserving their surface and water-retention properties. While these systems demonstrate properties relevant to topical applications, current research is largely exploratory, and their use in commercial cosmetic formulations remains limited compared to naturally sourced mucins.

Despite increasing use in cosmetic products, much of the supporting evidence is derived from in vitro studies or small-scale investigations, and variability in source material and processing methods complicates comparison across studies.

=== Mucin cosmetic market size ===
A variety of mucin cosmetic products are available on the market and can be purchased at pharmacies, supermarkets, cosmetic stores, or online. These products include toners, serums, moisturizers, masks, eye creams, cleansers, and more.

The global market for snail mucin cosmetics has increased rapidly, driven in part by the increasing popularity of K-beauty and "natural" skin care trends. The Asia-Pacific region, particularly South Korea, accounts for the largest portion of the market. In 2025, the global market was valued at 989.4 million USD and is projected to reach 3,112.7 million by 2035. This represents a compound annual growth rate (CAGR) of 12.1%.

=== Risks and ethics ===
As mucin cosmetic use has expanded, questions regarding its safety have been explored. Current evidence indicates that mucin cosmetic products are generally well tolerated by most users when applied topically. Systematic reviews have revealed that snail mucin ingredients in various dermatologic products lead to improved skin barrier and hydration with no serious adverse events reported over weeks of use. A recent review concluded that topical mucin products appear safe for most users in short-term studies, but emphasized the need for longer clinical trials to fully determine safety and efficacy. Overall, while current findings suggest short-term safety, further studies are needed to establish more comprehensive conclusions regarding safety and risks.

In addition to safety, ethical concerns regarding the production of mucin cosmetics have been raised. Snail mucin extraction methods include natural extraction which is painless and produces a lower yield. as well as other techniques like electrical stimulation and mechanical or chemical induction. While these other methods can produce higher yields, they can induce stress or harm to the snails. The increasing demand for snail mucin products has placed pressure on these cosmetic companies, highlighting the need for ethical collection methods and appropriate living conditions for snails.

== Biomedical applications ==
Mucus, a biopolymer that lines all moist epithelia of humans and animals, is composed of up to 70% mucins by mass. Due to the important role mucins play throughout the human body including, but not limited to, digestion, reproduction, lubrication, and immunity, they are of interest in medical research. They are generally biocompatible due to their natural occurrence in the human body and portray many promising characteristics for the development and advancement of health and medicine. Outlined below are a few of the potential applications of mucins in biomedicine.

=== Natural mucin biopolymers as anti-viral agents ===
All mucins contain a serine, threonine, and proline rich regions that are sites for O-glycosylation. The arrayed O-glycans strongly interact with water molecules, enabling mucins to hydrate, lubricate, and protect biological interfaces against dehydration, mechanical stress, oxidative degradation. Specific glycans may inhibit infection from viruses and bacteria.

Mucins have potential use as prospective broad-spectrum antiviral agents due to the wide range of viruses that can be inhibited by differing isolated mucins. Obtaining large amounts of mucins from human sources is difficult. In one study by Lieleg at all (2012), mucins isolated from the mucosa of porcine stomachs were introduced in human cervical cell (HeLa) culture as an alternative source of bulk mucin glycoproteins. Porcine mucus was found to be a cytocompatible material that did not compromise the viability of the HeLa cells. Tested against viruses of differing diameters, the porcine mucins showed a decrease in cells infected by HPV-16 (~nm) from 65% in a HEPES buffer to ~6%, with a similar finding for both Meckel cell polyoma-virus (MCV, ~50nm) and Influenza A (~100nm). The immobilization of the viruses within the mucin matrix (~340nm) was hypothesized to be due to the interactions with the sugar groups as well as weak non-covalent forces such as van der Waals forces and hydrogen bonding. The ability for mucin to limit diffusion of viruses much smaller in diameter than the matrix itself rules out previously thought methods of steric hinderance.

=== Mucin mimetics and mucin-based materials ===
Natural mucins can be difficult to isolate, making mucin mimetics a popular area of research. A recent example of branched glycopolymer scaffolds used stepwise reactions on solid support to synthesize glycooliogoamidoamines. These glycooliogoamidoamines were then put onto an ester scaffold and conjugated to sugars.

Mucin-based materials have shown significant potential in biomedical applications by combining antimicrobial regulation with enhanced material properties. Rather than eliminating bacteria, mucin-mimetic glycopolymers can suppress biofilm formation by altering bacterial behavior, effectively reducing virulence without disrupting the overall microbial balance. This approach focuses on altering bacterial behavior to reduce virulence, rather than killing the bacteria. At the same time, mucin-based hydrogels have been engineered to be stronger and more adhesive, using catechol-thiol cross-linking to enable fast gel formation and attachment to wet surfaces. These hydrogels can function as tissue adhesives and antifouling coatings, while also maintaining mucin's natural bioactivity in preventing bacterial colonization.

These examples highlight how mucin-based biomaterials and mucin mimetics can be engineered to integrate both the biological function and structural performance of mucins, showing promise for applications in wound healing and infection prevention. There is also opportunity in improved drug delivery methods. No matter how it is administered, for a drug to be absorbed and enter the body's circulation, it must first pass through mucus. There is an emphasis on studying how optimizing the ability of drugs to interact with mucus would allow for more efficient and targeted drug delivery.

== See also ==
- Bovine submaxillary mucin coatings
- Verotoxin-producing Escherichia coli
