= Gastric mucosal barrier =

Part of the stomach

Diagram of the Alkaline Mucous layer in the stomach with mucosal defense mechanism

The gastric mucosal barrier allows the stomach to safely contain the gastric acid and pepsin which would otherwise cause caustic injury and autodigestion of the tissues of the stomach. It consists of a gel-like mucous layer which traps a thin layer of bicarbonate-rich fluid beneath it. The mucus layer thus normally significantly slows diffusion of H^{+} ions, and any H^{+} ions that penetrate the mucus layer are neutralized by the bicarbonate.

If the barrier is disrupted, as by acetylsalicylic acid, acid reaches the mucosa where it may cause damage to the tissues of the stomach itself.

== Physiology ==
=== Mucus secretion ===
The mucus layer is composed largely of mucins (MUC1, MUC5, and MUC6), phospholipids, water, and electrolytes. In addition to protection from noxious substances, the mucous layer also protects the gastric mucosa from abrasion by stomach contents. Different types of mucus are secreted by three types of mucous cells: surface mucous cells (on the surface of the stomach), mucous neck cells (situated at the junctions of gastric pits with the gastric glands), and glandular mucous cells (of the gastric glands).

Because mechanical abrasion can strip away pieces of mucus and very low pH causes mucus to precipitate and slough off, the mucous layer is in a perpetual process of turnover and reconstitution. The chief two stimuli promoting increased mucus production are vagal paraysmpathetic stimulation (with aCh binding to acetylcholine receptors leading to increased intracellular Ca^{2+} levels which induce mucus release), and direct physical or chemical irritation of the mucosa. Mucus secretion is also promoted by PGE2.

=== Bicarbonate secretion ===
Bicarbonate is secreted by epithelial cells of the gastric mucosa and trapped beneath the mucus layer to maintain a local "microclimate" with a pH of ~7. Bicarbonate appears to be taken up across the basolateral membrane of epithelial cells by the Na^{+}/HCO_{3}^{-} cotransporter, and trafficked across the apical membrane by the Cl-HCO_{3} exchanger.

Bicarbonate secretion is thought to be regulated by vagal parasympathetic stimulation (secondary to increased intracellular Ca^{2+} levels which induce bicarbonate secretion) especially in response to feeding, neurally and by local paracrine signalling by PGE2 in response to intraluminal acid, as well as by a humoral factors.

=== Epithelial structure ===
The final, anatomical component of the gastric barrier against luminal acidity is the relatively impermeable gastric apical membrane and tight junctions between epithelial cells of the gastric glands.

== Pathophysiology ==
Various factors may disrupt the integrity of the barrier, including Helicobacter pylori infection, alcohol, and nonsteroidal anti-inflammatory drugs (NSAIDs), bile acid, gastric ulcers.

Back-diffusion of acid into endothelial cell is thought to cause mucosal damage by inducing release of histamine and inflammatory mediators from mast cell; this promotes healing with minor injuries, but causes ischaemia with more serious injuries.

== See also ==
- Alkaline mucus
