= Mucin 2 =

Protein-coding gene in the species Homo sapiens

MUC2

Identifiers
- Aliases: MUC2, MLP, MUC-2, SMUC, mucin 2, oligomeric mucus/gel-forming
- External IDs: OMIM: 158370; MGI: 1339364; GeneCards: MUC2

Gene location (Human)
Chr.	Chromosome 11 (human)
Band	11p15.5	Start	1,074,875 bp
Band	11p15.5	End	1,110,511 bp

Gene location (Mouse)
Chr.	Chromosome 7 (mouse)
Band	7 F5|7 87.1 cM	Start	141,276,583 bp
Band	7 F5|7 87.1 cM	End	141,308,430 bp
RNA expression pattern
Bgee	Human / Mouse (ortholog); Top expressed in: mucosa of transverse colon; rectum; duodenum; appendix; epithelium of colon; smooth muscle tissue; olfactory zone of nasal mucosa; muscle layer of sigmoid colon; right coronary artery; urinary bladder / Top expressed in: jejunum; colon; ileum; duodenum; neural layer of retina; urinary bladder; zygote; tail of embryo; embryo; embryo; More reference expression data
BioGPS	n/a
Gene ontology
Molecular function	protein binding
Cellular component	extracellular region; outer mucus layer; Golgi lumen; inner mucus layer; mucus layer; plasma membrane; collagen-containing extracellular matrix
Biological process	O-glycan processing; maintenance of gastrointestinal epithelium; stimulatory C-type lectin receptor signaling pathway
Sources:Amigo / QuickGO
Orthologs
Databases	NCBI: entry; OMA: entry
Species	Human	Mouse
Entrez	4583	17831
Ensembl	ENSG00000198788	ENSMUSG00000025515
UniProt	Q02817	n/a
RefSeq (mRNA)	NM_002457	NM_023566
RefSeq (protein)	NP_002448	n/a
Location (UCSC)	Chr 11: 1.07 – 1.11 Mb	Chr 7: 141.28 – 141.31 Mb
PubMed search
- Wikidata
View/Edit Human	View/Edit Mouse

Mucin 2, oligomeric mucus gel-forming, also known as MUC2, is a protein that in humans is encoded by the MUC2 gene belonging to the mucin protein family.

== Function ==
This gene encodes a member of the gel-forming mucin protein family. The protein encoded by this gene, also called mucin 2, is secreted onto mucosal surfaces.

Mucin 2 is particularly prominent in the gut where it is secreted from goblet cells in the epithelial lining. There, mucin 2, along with small amounts of related-mucin proteins, polymerizes into a gel of which 80% by weight is oligosaccharide side-chains that are added as post-translational modifications to the mucin proteins. This gel serves as a physico-chemical barrier to protect the intestinal epithelium from for example shear stress, pathogens, and external particles.

Various intestinal diseases, like intestinal bowel disease (IBD) are associated with MUC2 dysregulation.

== Genetics ==
The mucin 2 protein features a central domain containing tandem repeats rich in threonine and proline that varies between 50 and 115 copies in different individuals. Alternatively spliced transcript variants of this gene have been described, but their full-length nature is not known.

== Goblet cell mediated MUC2 secretion ==
Newly synthesized MUC2 proteins are densly packed in mucus granules and transported to the plasma membranes within goblet cells. Those mucus granules fuse with the plasma membrane and MUC2 is being released into the gut lumen. Due to its physical properties, MUC2 expands and disperses upon release, becoming a part of the existing mucus barrier.
