= BSM =

BSM may refer to:

== Education ==
- Benilde-St. Margaret's, a Catholic, co-educational college prep school in Saint Louis Park, Minnesota, USA
- Black-Scholes-Merton formula, a formula to calculate option prices
- Black Student Movement, at the University of North Carolina at Chapel Hill, US
- Bloomingdale School of Music, Manhattan, New York City, New York, US
- British School of Motoring, a British driving school
- Budapest Semesters in Mathematics, program for North American students, Budapest, Hungary

== Military ==
- Band Sergeant Major, a warrant officer appointment in the British Army
- Battery Sergeant Major, a warrant officer appointment in some Commonwealth artillery corps
- Bronze Star Medal
- The IATA code of the former Bergstrom Air Force Base

== Organizations ==
- Bangladesh Society of Microbiologists
- Big Scary Monsters Recording Company, a record label based in the UK
- Brick Squad Monopoly, a subsidiary of the 1017 Brick Squad Record label
- Blue Star Mothers

== Science and technology ==
- Bag Source Message, corresponding to an airline bag tag
- Basic Safety Message, a type of message sent in dedicated short-range communications, used in automotive
- Basic Security Module (OpenBSM), a computer auditing system
- Beyond the Standard Model, extensions to, or phenomena not explained by, the standard theory of particle physics
- Blind Spot Monitor, a vehicle-based sensor system
- Bovine Submaxillary Mucin Coatings, a biocompatible coating used to reduce bacterial cell adhesion
- Business semantics management, an approach to align data (formats, content, metadata, etc.) to the business
- Business service management, an information technology methodology

== Other uses ==
- Baltimore Streetcar Museum, in Baltimore, Maryland, USA
- Bata Shoe Museum, in Toronto, Ontario, Canada
- Britain's Strongest Man, an annual competition
