= Goblet cell =

Epithelial cells that secrete mucins

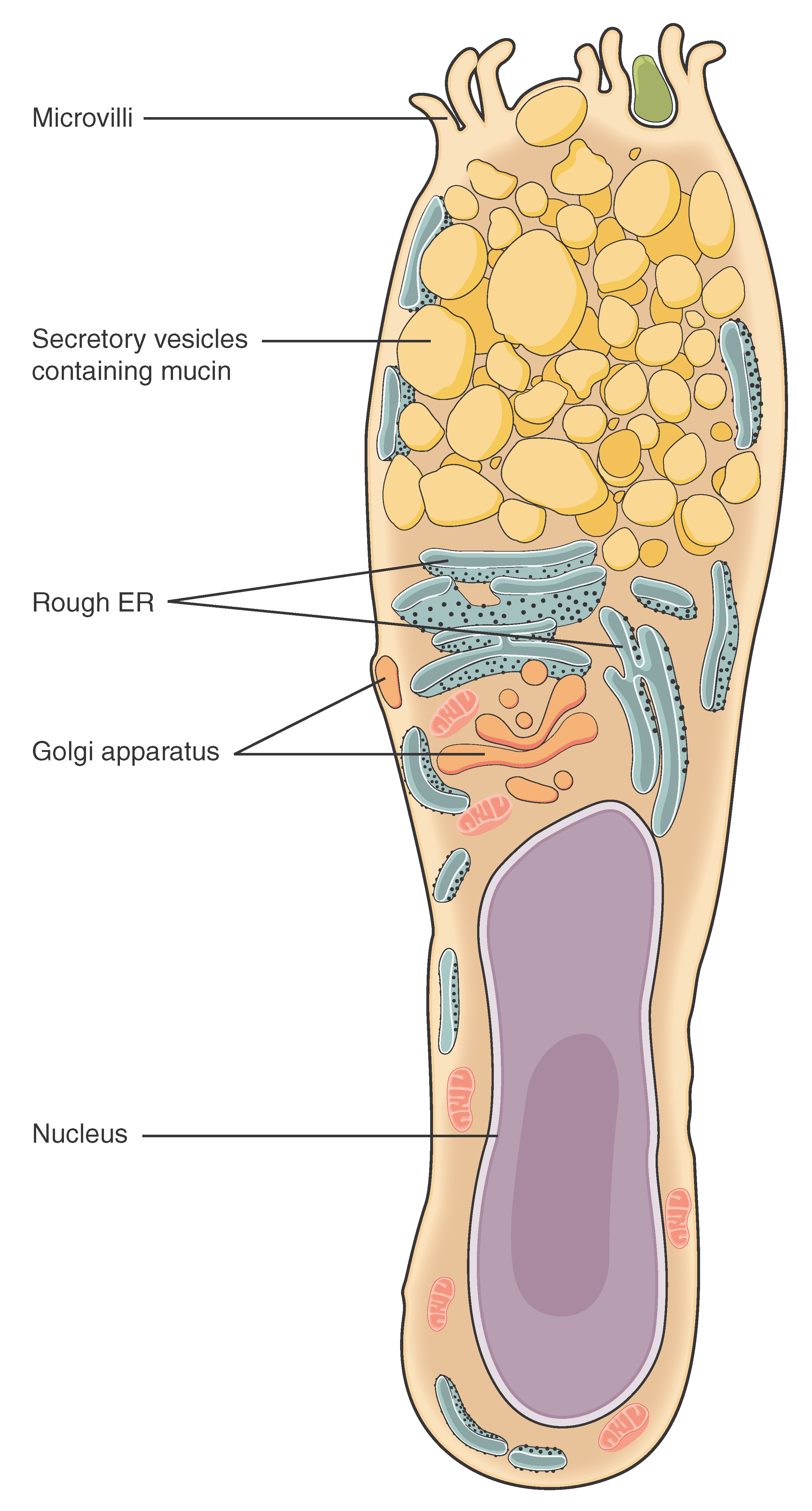
- Schematic illustration of a goblet cell in close up, illustrating different internal structures of the cell.

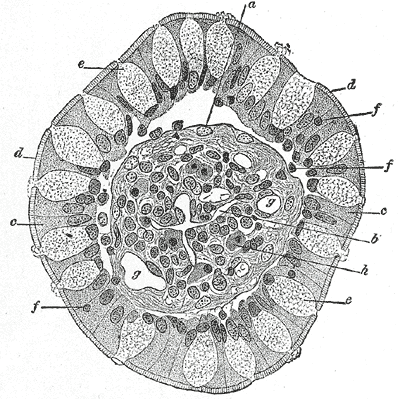
- Transverse section of a villus, from the human intestine. X 350. a. Basement membrane, here somewhat shrunken away from the epithelium. b. Lacteal. c. Columnar epithelium. d. Its striated border. e. Goblet cells. f. Leucocytes in epithelium. f'. Leucocytes below epithelium. g. Blood vessels. h. Muscle cells cut across.

Details
- System: Respiratory system
- Shape: Simple columnar
- Function: Mucin-producing epithelial cells

Identifiers
- Latin: exocrinocytus caliciformis
- MeSH: D020397
- TH: H3.04.03.0.00009, H3.04.03.0.00016, H3.05.00.0.00006
- FMA: 13148

Goblet cells are simple columnar epithelial cells that secrete gel-forming mucins, like mucin 2 in the lower gastrointestinal tract, and mucin 5AC in the respiratory tract. The goblet cells mainly use the merocrine method of secretion, secreting vesicles into a duct, but may use apocrine methods, budding off their secretions, when under stress. The term goblet refers to the cell's goblet-like shape. The apical portion is shaped like a cup, as it is distended by abundant mucus laden granules; its basal portion lacks these granules and is shaped like a stem.

The goblet cell is highly polarized with the nucleus and other organelles concentrated at the base of the cell and secretory granules containing mucin, at the apical surface. The apical plasma membrane projects short microvilli to give an increased surface area for secretion.

Goblet cells are typically found in the respiratory, reproductive and lower gastrointestinal tracts and are surrounded by other columnar cells. Biased differentiation of airway basal cells in the respiratory epithelium into goblet cells plays a key role in the excessive mucus production, known as mucus hypersecretion, seen in many respiratory diseases, including chronic bronchitis and asthma.

== Structure ==
Goblet cells are found scattered among the epithelial lining of organs, such as the intestinal and respiratory tracts. They are found inside the trachea, bronchi, and larger bronchioles in the respiratory tract, small intestines, the large intestine, and conjunctiva in the upper eyelid. In the conjunctiva goblet cells are a source of mucin in tears and they also secrete different types of mucins onto the ocular surface. In the lacrimal glands, mucus is synthesized by acinar cells instead.

=== Microanatomy ===
Goblet cells are simple columnar epithelial cells, having a height of four times that of their width. The cytoplasm of goblet cells tends to be displaced toward the basal end of the cell body by the large mucin granules, which accumulate near the apical surface of the cell along the Golgi apparatus, which lies between the granules and the nucleus. This gives the basal part of the cell a basophilic staining because of nucleic acids within the nucleus and rough endoplasmic reticulum staining with hematoxylin. Mucin within the granules stains pale in routine histology sections, primarily because these carbohydrate-rich proteins are washed out in the preparation of microscopy samples. However, they stain easily with the PAS staining method, which colours them magenta.

In mucicarmine stains, deep red mucin is found within goblet cell bodies. Goblet cells can be seen in the examples below as the larger, more pale cells.

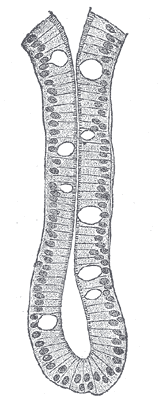
An intestinal gland from the human intestine with goblet cells visible

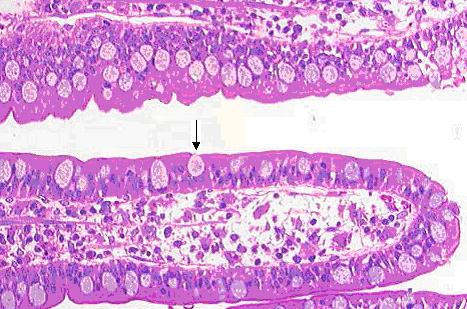
Goblet cell in ileum

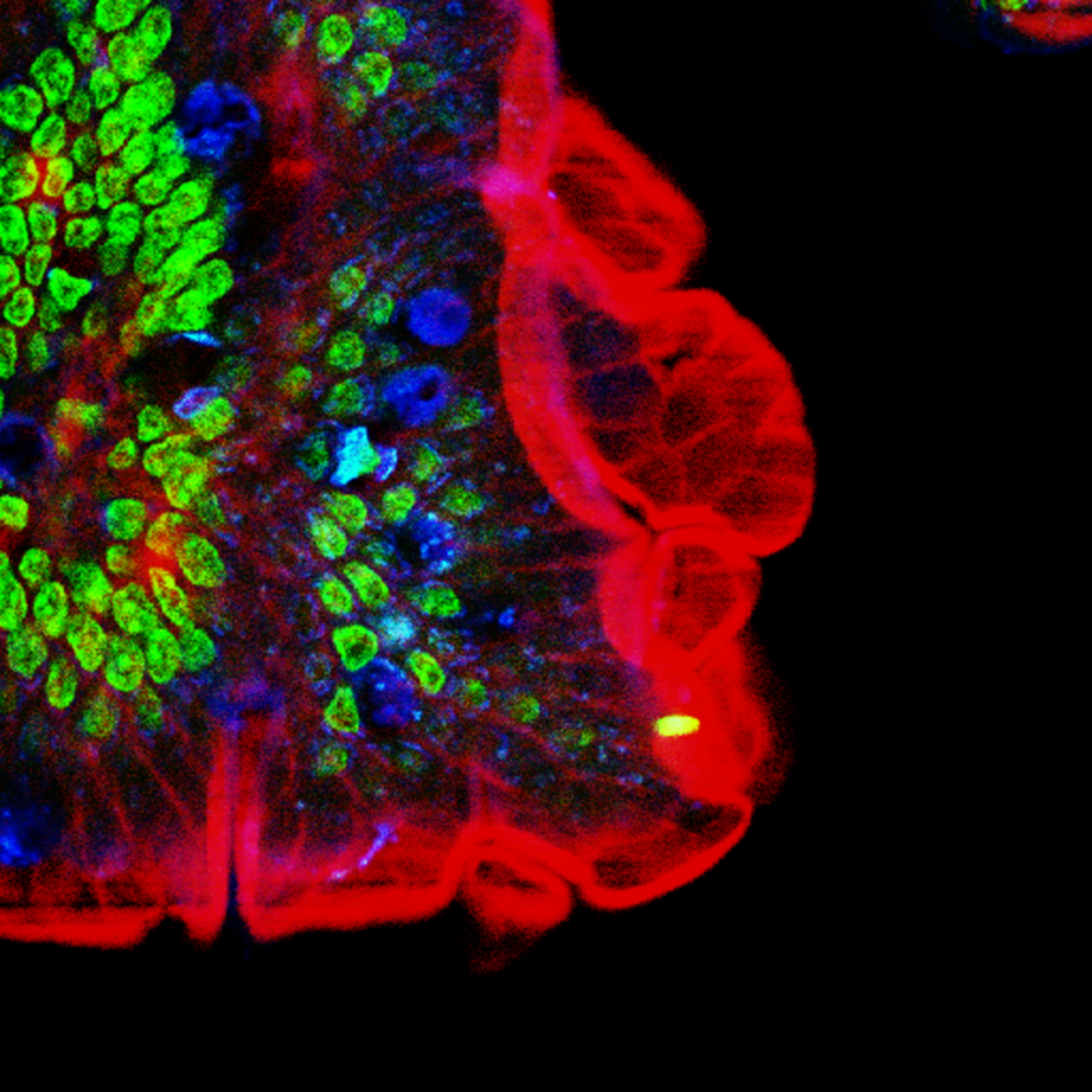
Section of mouse intestine, mucus of goblet cells in blue

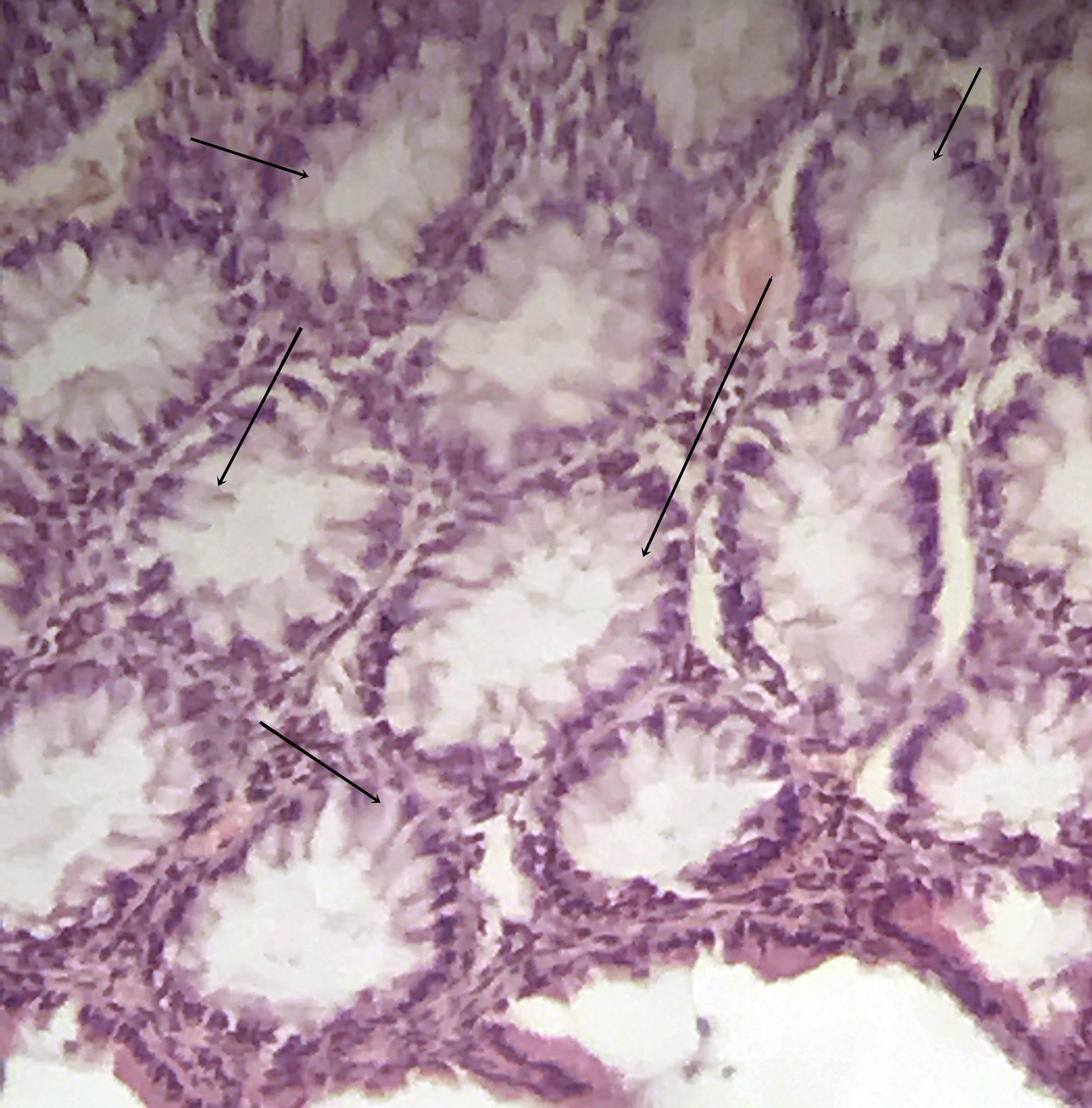
Goblet cells in large intestine

== Function ==
The main role of goblet cells is to secrete mucus in order to protect the mucous membranes where they are found. Goblet cells accomplish this by secreting mucins, large glycoproteins formed mostly by carbohydrates. The gel-like properties of mucins are given by its glycans (bound carbohydrates) attracting relatively large quantities of water. On the inner surface of the human intestine, it forms a 200 μm thick layer (less in other animals) that lubricates and protects the wall of the organ.

Distinct forms of mucin are produced in different organs: while MUC2 is prevalent in the intestine, MUC5AC and MUC5B are the main forms found in the human airway. In the airway, mucus is swept by the cilia of the respiratory epithelium, in a process called mucociliary clearance, and propelled out of the lungs and into the pharynx, which results in the removal of debris and pathogens from the airway. MUC5AC is overexpressed in hypersensitivity pneumonitis.

Mucins are continuously made and secreted by goblet cells in order to repair and replace the existing mucus layer. Mucins are stored in granules inside the goblet cells before being released to the lumen of the organ. Mucin secretion in the airway may occur via regulated secretion. Secretion may be stimulated by irritants such as dust and smoke, especially in the airway. Other stimuli are microbes such as viruses and bacteria.

Anomalies in the number of goblet cells are associated with changes in the secretion of mucins, which can result in many of the abnormalities seen in asthma patients, such as clogged airways due to mucus hypersecretion, and eventual loss of lung function. Overexpression of MUC5AC alone does not result in the pathophysiology seen in asthma patients; it is the excessive production along with the speed of secretion that leads to the formation of thick mucus that cannot be removed by cilia or coughing action. This, in addition to airway narrowing leads to the clogging of the airways, which can be detrimental to health if not treated.

There are other cells that secrete mucus (such as the foveolar cells of the stomach) but these are distinguished histologically from goblet cells.

=== Role in oral tolerance ===
Oral tolerance is the process by which the immune system is prevented from responding to antigen derived from food products, as peptides from food may pass into the bloodstream via the gut, which would in theory lead to an immune response. A paper published in Nature in 2012 has shed some light on the process and implicated goblet cells as having a role in the process. It was known that CD103-expressing dendritic cells of the lamina propria had a role to play in the induction of oral tolerance (potentially by inducing the differentiation of regulatory T cells), and this paper suggests that the goblet cells act to preferentially deliver antigen to these CD103^{+} dendritic cells.

== Clinical significance ==
=== Allergic asthma ===
The excessive mucus production seen in allergic asthma patients is due to goblet cell metaplasia, the differentiation of airway epithelial cells into mucin producing goblet cells. These cells produce the thick mucins MUC5AC and MUC5B, which clog the airway, leading to the airflow obstruction characteristic of asthma.

Goblet cell metaplasia in allergic asthma is due to the action of the cytokine IL-13. IL-13 binds to the IL-4Rα receptor and initiates a STAT6 signalling response. Binding of IL-13 causes phosphorylation of tyrosine residues at the IL-4Rα. This results in docking of STAT6 monomers, which themselves are phosphorylated and then subsequently leave the receptor and congregate form STAT6 homodimers in the cytoplasm. These homodimers then enter the nucleus, where they bind to regulatory elements in the DNA, which affects the transcription of certain genes involved in mucus production.

Induction of STAT6 signaling by IL-13 leads to increased of expression of 15-lipoxygenase (15-LO-1), which is an enzyme involved in the breakdown of unsaturated fatty acids. 15-lipoxygenase acts by binding to phospholipids and yields hydroperoxy and epoxy metabolites. One such metabolite, 15-hydroxyeicosatetranoic acid (15-HETE), is released intracellularly, where it conjugates to phosphatidylethanolamine, a phospholipid component. 15-HETE-PE induces expression of the mucin MUC5AC.

=== Goblet cell carcinoids ===
Goblet cell carcinoids are a class of rare tumors that form as a result of an excessive proliferation of both goblet and neuroendocrine cells. The majority of these tumors arise in the appendix and may present symptoms similar to the much more common acute appendicitis. The main treatment for localized goblet cells tumors is removal of the appendix, and sometimes removal of the right hemicolon is also performed. Disseminated tumors may require treatment with chemotherapy in addition to surgery.

=== Metaplasia ===
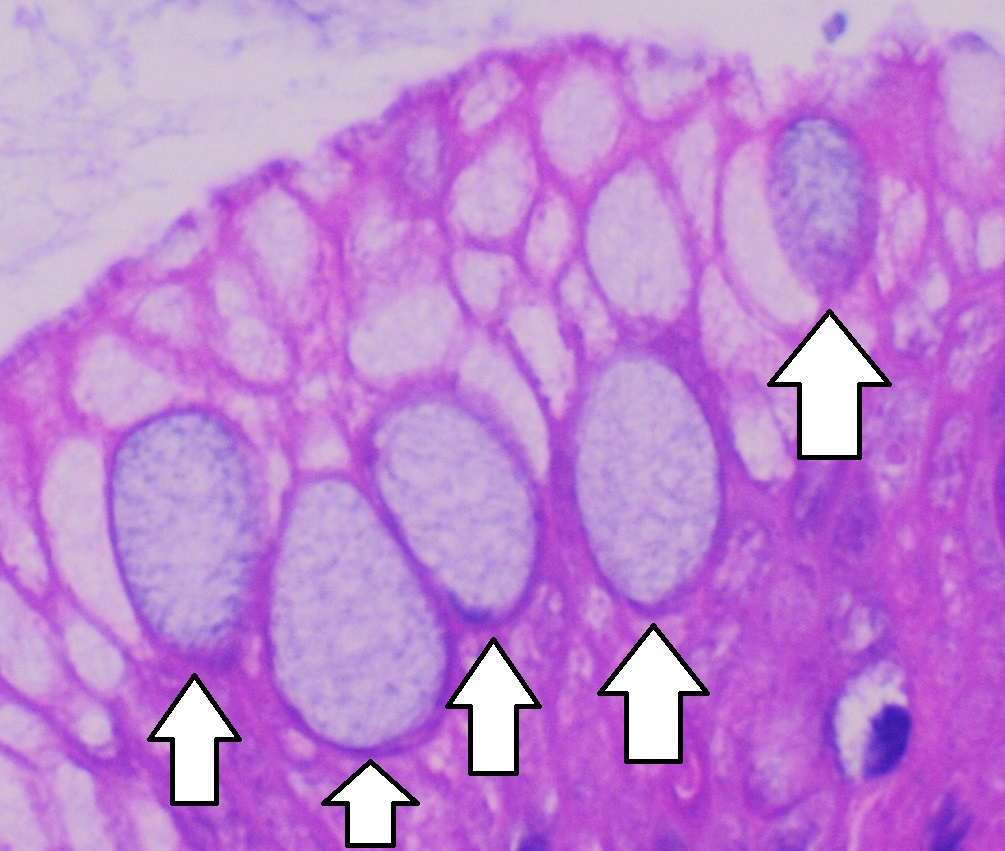
Incomplete intestinal metaplasia (incomplete Barrett's esophagus), showing both foveolar cells and goblet cells, latter indicated by arrows, and usually having a slightly bluish color compared to the apical cytoplasm of foveolar cells on H&E stain.

Barrett's esophagus is a metaplasia of the esophagus into intestinal epithelium, characterized by the presence of goblet cells.

=== Colonic mucosa ===
Bile acids are a significant factor in the etiology of colorectal cancer. Bile acids induce apoptosis in goblet cells of the colonic mucosa at bile acid concentrations that are comparable to those found in fecal water after high fat-meals. An association was observed between resistance to bile acid-induced apoptosis in goblet cells and colon cancer risk.

=== Treatments ===
==== Monoclonal antibodies ====
Studies of mice given monoclonal antibodies for IL-13 results in decreased expression of goblet cells in asthma patients. Some treatments that use anti-IL-13 monoclonal antibodies include tralokinumab, and lebrikizumab. These treatments have shown improvements in asthma patients, yet there are still limitations to the use of anti-IL-13 monoclonal antibodies. Dupilumab is a newer drug that targets the shared receptor of IL-4 and IL-13, IL4Rα. Since IL-4 and IL-13 have interrelated biological activities, Dupilumab is a more effective form of treatment as it targets both interleukins.

== History ==
The cells were first noted by Henle in 1837 when studying the lining of the small intestine, seen to be mucus producing by Leydig in 1857 (who was examining the epidermis of fish), and were given their name by Schulze in 1867, Schulze chose the descriptive name "goblet" because of the shape of the cell, rather than a functional name, as he remained uncertain as to the mucus-producing function of the cell.

In the present day, these cells are used in laboratories to evaluate the intestinal absorption of drug targets with different kits, such as the CacoGoblet.

== See also ==
- List of human cell types derived from the germ layers
- List of distinct cell types in the adult human body
