= Otog =

Otog may refer to:

- Otog Banner, in Inner Mongolia, China
- Otog Front Banner, in Inner Mongolia, China
- Otogelin, a protein encoded by the gene OTOG
