= Alkaline mucus =

Thick fluid produced by animals

Alkaline mucus is a thick fluid produced by animals which confers tissue protection in an acidic environment, such as in the stomach.

== Properties ==
Mucus that serves a protective function against acidic environments generally has a high viscosity, though the thickness and viscosity of the mucus layer can vary due to several factors. For example, alkaline mucus in the stomach increases in thickness when the stomach is distended. The pH level of the mucus also plays a role in its viscosity, as higher pH levels tend to alter the thickness of the mucus, making it less viscous. Because of this, invading agents such as Helicobacter pylori, a bacterium that causes stomach ulcers, can alter the pH of the mucus to make the mucus pliable enough to move through. Exposure to atmospheric air also tends to increase the pH level of alkaline mucus.

== In humans ==
In humans, alkaline mucus is present in several organs and provides protection by way of its alkalinity and high viscosity. Alkaline mucus exists in the human eye, stomach, saliva, and cervix.

In the stomach, alkaline mucus is secreted by some gastric glands in the gastric mucosa of the stomach wall. Secretion of alkaline mucus is necessary to protect the mucous membrane of the stomach from acids released during digestion. Ulcers can develop as a result of damage caused to the gastric mucosal barrier. Duodenal ulcers have been shown to develop in sites that are in direct contact with pepsin and acids. To prevent damage and protect the mucus epithelium, alkaline mucus secretions increase in the digestive system when food is being eaten.

In the cervix, alkaline mucus has been shown to possess bactericidal properties to protect the cervix, uterus, peritoneal cavity, and vagina from microbes.
