= Lung flute =

A lung flute is a medical device used to clear mucus from congested lungs with low-frequency sound waves. The device consists of a mouthpiece and a plastic reed which vibrates within a chamber to create sound waves in the chest cavity. These sound waves vibrate and break up mucus deposits in the lungs, allowing cilia to more easily move these deposits from the lungs to the throat.

Initially invented by acoustics engineer Sandy Hawkins, the lung flute is currently in use as a diagnostic tool in Japan, Europe, and Canada, and on January 4, 2010, was granted approval by the U.S. Food and Drug Administration (FDA) for use in the United States.
