= Submucosal glands =

List of various racemose exocrine glands

Submucosal glands can refer to various racemose exocrine glands of the mucous type. These glands secrete mucus to facilitate the movement of particles along the body's various tubes, such as the throat and intestines. The mucosa is the lining of the tubes, like a kind of skin. Submucosal means that the actual gland resides in the connecting tissue below the mucosa. The submucosa is the tissue that connects the mucosa to the muscle outside the tube.

The glands themselves are quite complex. The mucus factory is at the bottom, in the submucosa, it is composed of many little sacs (acini) where the mucus originates. Each sac (acinus) has one end that can open and close (dilate) to allow the mucus out. The acini empty into little tubes (tubules) that lead to a reservoir (collecting duct) that has a portal through the skin (mucosa) that can open and close allowing the mucus into the main tube.

The submucosal glands are a companion to goblet cells which also produce mucus, and are found lining the same tubes.

- In the upper respiratory system of mammals there are submucosal glands in the airways, notably in the sinuses, the trachea and the bronchial tubes.
- In the visual systems of mammals.
- In the auditory systems of mammals.
- In the throat there are the esophageal submucosal glands, the submucosal glands of the esophagus.
- For the intestine there are Brunner's glands, the submucosal glands of the duodenum.
