= Surface modification of biomaterials with proteins =

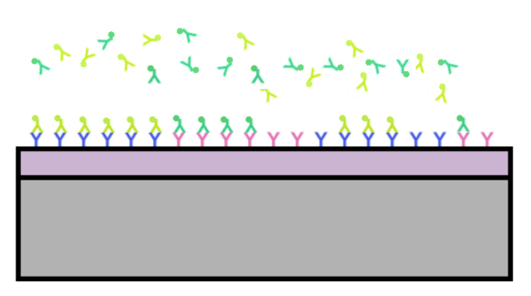
Protein patterning – chessboard pattern

Biomaterials are materials that are used in contact with biological systems. Biocompatibility and applicability of surface modification with current uses of metallic, polymeric and ceramic biomaterials allow alteration of properties to enhance performance in a biological environment while retaining bulk properties of the desired device.

Surface modification involves the fundamentals of physicochemical interactions between the biomaterial and the physiological environment at the molecular, cellular and tissue levels (reduce bacterial adhesion, promote cell adhesion). Currently, there are various methods of characterization and surface modification of biomaterials and useful applications of fundamental concepts in several biomedical solutions.

== Function ==
The function of surface modification is to change the physical and chemical properties of surfaces to improve the functionality of the original material. Protein surface modification of various types biomaterials (ceramics, polymers, metals, composites) is performed to ultimately increase biocompatibility of the material and interact as a bioactive material for specific applications. In various biomedical applications of developing implantable medical devices (such as pacemakers and stents), surface properties/interactions of proteins with a specific material must be evaluated with regards to biocompatibility as it plays a major role in determining a biological response. For instance, surface hydrophobicity or hydrophilicity of a material can be altered. Engineering biocompatibility between the physiological environment and the surface material allows new medical products, materials and surgical procedures with additional biofunctionality.

Surface modification can be done through various methods, which can be classified through three main groups: physical (physical adsorption, Langmuir blodgett film), chemical (oxidation by strong acids, ozone treatment, chemisorption, and flame treatment) and radiation (glow discharge, corona discharge, photo activation (UV), laser, ion beam, plasma immersion ion implantation, electron beam lithography, and γ-irradiation).

=== Biocompatibility ===
In a biomedical perspective, biocompatibility is the ability of a material to perform with an appropriate host response in a specific application. It is described to be non-toxic, no induced adverse reactions such as chronic inflammatory response with unusual tissue formation, and designed to function properly for a reasonable lifetime. It is a requirement of biomaterials in which the surface modified material will cause no harm to the host, and the material itself will not harmed by the host. Although most synthetic biomaterials have the physical properties that meet or even exceed those of natural tissue, they often result in an unfavorable physiological reaction such as thrombosis formation, inflammation and infection.

Biointegration is the ultimate goal in for example orthopedic implants that bones establish a mechanically solid interface with complete fusion between the artificial implanted material and bone tissues under good biocompatibility conditions. Modifying the surface of a material can improve its biocompatibility, and can be done without changing its bulk properties. The properties of the uppermost molecular layers are critical in biomaterials since the surface layers are in physicochemical contact with the biological environment.

Furthermore, although some of the biomaterials have good biocompatibility, it may possess poor mechanical or physical properties such as wear resistance, anti-corrosion, or wettability or lubricity. In these cases, surface modification is utilized to deposit a layer of coating or mixing with substrate to form a composite layer.

=== Cell adhesion ===
As proteins are made up of different sequences of amino acids, proteins can have various functions as its structural shape driven by a number of molecular bonds can change. Amino acids exhibit different characteristics such as being polar, non-polar, positively or negatively charged which is determined by having different side chains. Thus, attachment of molecules with different protein for example, those containing Arginine-Glycine-Aspartate (RGD) sequences are expected to modify the surface of tissue scaffolds and result in improvement of cell adhesion when placed into its physiological environment. Additional modifications of the surface could be through attachment of functional groups of 2D or 3D patterns on the surface so that cell alignment is guided and new tissue formation is improved.

=== Biomedical materials ===
Some of the surface modification techniques listed above are particularly used for certain functions or kinds of materials. One of the advantages of plasma immersion ion implantation is its ability to treat most materials. Ion implantation is an effective surface treatment technique that be used to enhance the surface properties of biomaterials. The unique advantage of plasma modification is that the surface properties and biocompatibility can be enhanced selectively while the favorable bulk attributes of the materials such as strength remain unchanged. Overall, it is an effective method to modify medical implants with complex shape. By altering the surface functionalities using plasma modification, the optimal surface, chemical and physical properties can be obtained.

Plasma immersion implantation is a technique suitable for low melting point materials such as polymers, and widely accepted to improve adhesion between pinhole free layers and substrates. The ultimate goal is to enhance the properties of biomaterials such as biocompatibility, corrosion resistance and functionality with the fabrication of different types of biomedical thin films with various biologically important elements such as nitrogen, calcium, and sodium implanted with them. Different thin films such as titanium oxide, titanium nitride, and diamond-like carbon have been treated previously, and results show that the processed material exhibit better biocompatibility compared to the some current ones used in biomedical implants. In order to evaluate the biocompatibility of the fabricated thin films, various in vitro biological environment need to be conducted.

== Biological response ==
The immune system will react differently if an implant is coated in extra-cellular matrix proteins. The proteins surrounding the implant serve to "hide" the implant from the innate immune system. However, if the implant is coated in allergenic proteins, the patient's adaptive immune response may be initiated. To prevent such a negative immune reaction, immunosuppressive drugs may be prescribed, or autologous tissue may produce the protein coating.

=== Acute response ===
Immediately following insertion, an implant (and the tissue damage from surgery) will result in acute inflammation. The classic signs of acute inflammation are redness, swelling, heat, pain, and loss of function. Hemorrhaging from tissue damage results in clotting which stimulates latent mast cells. The mast cells release chemokines which activate blood vessel endothelium. The blood vessels dilate and become leaky, producing the redness and swelling associated with acute inflammation. The activated endothelium allows extravasation of blood plasma and white blood cells including macrophages which transmigrate to the implant and recognize it as non-biologic. Macrophages release oxidants to combat the foreign body. If antioxidants fail to destroy the foreign body, chronic inflammation begins.

=== Chronic response ===
Implantation of non-degradable materials will eventually result in chronic inflammation and fibrous capsule formation. Macrophages that fail to destroy pathogens will merge to form a foreign-body giant cell which quarantines the implant. High levels of oxidants cause fibroblasts to secrete collagen, forming a layer of fibrous tissue around the implant.

By coating an implant with extracellular matrix proteins, macrophages will be unable to recognize the implant as non-biologic. The implant is then capable of continued interaction with the host, influencing the surrounding tissue toward various outcomes. For instance, the implant may improve healing by secreting angiogenic drugs.

== Fabrication techniques ==
=== Physical modification ===
Physical immobilization is simply coating a material with a biomimetic material without changing the structure of either. Various biomimetic materials with cell adhesive proteins (such as collagen or laminin) have been used in vitro to direct new tissue formation and cell growth. Cell adhesion and proliferation occurs much better on protein-coated surfaces. However, since the proteins are generally isolated, it is more likely to elicit an immune response. Generally, chemistry qualities should be taken into consideration.

=== Chemical modification ===
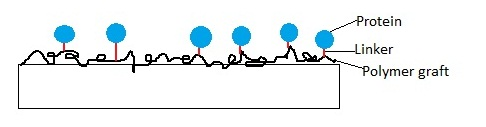
Covalent binding of protein with polymer graft

Alkali hydrolysis, covalent immobilization, and the wet chemical method are only three of the many ways to chemically modify a surface. The surface is prepped with surface activation, where several functionalities are placed on the polymer to react better with the proteins. In alkali hydrolysis, small protons diffuse between polymer chains and cause surface hydrolysis which cleaves ester bonds. This results in the formation of carboxyl and hydroxyl functionalities which can attach to proteins. In covalent immobilization, small fragments of proteins or short peptides are bonded to the surface. The peptides are highly stable and studies have shown that this method improves biocompatibility. The wet chemical method is one of the preferred methods of protein immobilization. Chemical species are dissolved in an organic solution where reactions take place to reduce the hydrophobic nature of the polymer. Surface stability is higher in chemical modification than in physical adsorption. It also offers higher biocompatibility towards cell growth and bodily fluid flow.

=== Photochemical modification ===
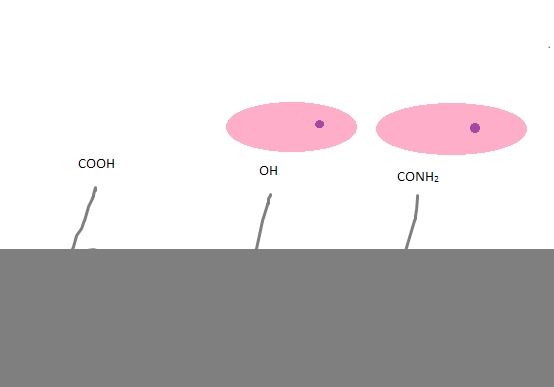
Cell adhesion for various functional groups. OH and CONH_{2} improve surface wetting compared with COOH

Successful attempts at grafting biomolecules onto polymers have been made using photochemical modification of biomaterials. These techniques employ high energy photons (typically UV) to break chemical bonds and release free radicals. Protein adhesion can be encouraged by favorably altering the surface charge of a biomaterial. Improved protein adhesion leads to better integration between the host and the implant. Ma et al. compared cell adhesion for various surface groups and found that OH and CONH_{2} improved PLLA wettability more than COOH.

Applying a mask to the surface of the biomaterial allows selective surface modification. Areas that UV light penetrate will be modified such that cells will adhere to the region more favorably.

The minimum feature size attainable is given by:

$$CD = k_1 \cdot\frac{\lambda}{NA}$$

where

$\,CD$ is the minimum feature size

$\,k_1$ (commonly called k1 factor) is a coefficient that encapsulates process-related factors, and typically equals 0.4 for production.

$\,\lambda$ is the wavelength of light used

$\,NA$ is the numerical aperture of the lens as seen from the wafer

According to this equation, greater resolution can be obtained by decreasing the wavelength, and increasing the numerical aperture.

=== Composites and graft formation ===
Graft formation improves the overall hydrophilicity of the material through a ratio of how much glycolic acid and lactic acid is added. Block polymer, or PLGA, decreases hydrophobicity of the surface by controlling the amount of glycolic acid. However, this doesn't increase the hydrophilic tendency of the material. In brush grafting, hydrophilic polymers containing alcohol or hydroxyl groups are placed onto surfaces through photopolymerization.

=== Plasma treatment ===
Plasma techniques are especially useful because they can deposit ultra thin (a few nm), adherent, conformal coatings. Glow discharge plasma is created by filling a vacuum with a low-pressure gas (ex. argon, ammonia, or oxygen). The gas is then excited using microwaves or current which ionizes it. The ionized gas is then thrown onto a surface at a high velocity where the energy produced physically and chemically changes the surface. After the changes occur, the ionized plasma gas is able to react with the surface to make it ready for protein adhesion. However, the surfaces may lose mechanical strength or other inherent properties because of the high amounts of energy.

Several plasma-based technologies have been developed to contently immobilize proteins depending on the final application of the resulting biomaterial. This technique is a relatively fast approach to produce smart bioactive surfaces.

== Applications ==
=== Bone tissue ===
Extra-cellular matrix (ECM) proteins greatly dictate the process of bone formation—the attachment and proliferation of osteogenitor cells, differentiation to osteoblasts, matrix formation, and mineralization. It is beneficial to design biomaterials for bone-contacting devices with bone matrix proteins to promote bone growth. It is also possible to covalently and directionally immobilize osteoinductive peptides in the surface of the ceramic materials such as hydroxyapatite/β-tricalcium phosphate to stimulate osteoblast differentiation and better bone regeneration RGD peptides have been shown to increase the attachment and migration of osteoblasts on titanium implants, polymeric materials, and glass. Other adhesive peptides that can be recognized by molecules in the cell membrane can also affect binding of bone-derived cells. Particularly, the heparin binding domain in fibronectin is actively involved in specific interaction with osteogenic cells. Modification with heparin binding domains have the potential to enhance the binding of osteoblasts without affecting the attachment of endothelial cells and fibroblasts. Additionally, growth factors such as those in the bone morphogenic protein family are important polypeptides to induce bone formation. These growth factors can be covalently bound to materials to enhance the osteointegration of implants.

=== Neural tissue ===
Peripheral nervous system damage is typically treated by an autograft of nerve tissue to bridge a severed gap. This treatment requires successful regeneration of neural tissue; axons must grow from the proximal stump without interference in order to make a connection with the distal stump. Neural guidance channels (NGC), have been designed as a conduit for growth of new axons and the differentiation and morphogenesis of these tissues is affected by interaction between neural cells and the surrounding ECM. Studies of laminin have shown the protein to be an important ECM protein in the attachment of neural cells. The penta-peptide YIGSR and IKVAV, which are important sequences in laminin, have been shown to increase attachment of neural cells with the ability to control the spatial organization of the cells.

=== Cardiovascular tissue ===
It is important that cardiovascular devices such as stents or artificial vascular grafts be designed to mimic properties of the specific tissue region the device is serving to replace. In order to reduce thrombogenicity, surfaces can be coated with fibronectin and RGD containing peptides, which encourages attachment of endothelial cells. The peptides YIGSR and REDV have also been shown to enhance attachment and spreading of endothelial cells and ultimately reduce the thrombogenicity of the implant.

Surface protein sequence	Function
RGD	Promotes cell adhesion
Osteopontin-1	Improves mineralization by osteoblasts
Laminin	Promotes neurite outgrowth
GVPGI	Improves mechanical stability of vascular grafts
REDV	Enhances endothelial cell adhesion
YIGSR	Promotes neural and endothelial cell attachment
PHPMA-RGD	Promotes axonal outgrowth
IKVAV	Promotes neural cell attachment
KQAGDVA	Promotes smooth muscle cell adhesion
VIPGIG	Enhances elastic modulus of artificial ECM
FKRRIKA	Improves mineralization by osteoblasts
KRSR	Promotes osteoblast adhesion
MEPE	Promotes osteoblast differentiation

== See also ==
- Bovine Submaxillary Mucin Coatings
