= Oviduct-specific glycoprotein =

Protein found in humans

OVGP1

Identifiers
- Aliases: OVGP1, CHIT5, EGP, MUC9, OGP, oviductal glycoprotein 1
- External IDs: OMIM: 603578; MGI: 106661; GeneCards: OVGP1

Gene location (Human)
Chr.	Chromosome 1 (human)
Band	1p13.2	Start	111,414,319 bp
Band	1p13.2	End	111,427,735 bp

Gene location (Mouse)
Chr.	Chromosome 3 (mouse)
Band	3|3 F2.2	Start	105,881,027 bp
Band	3|3 F2.2	End	105,894,739 bp
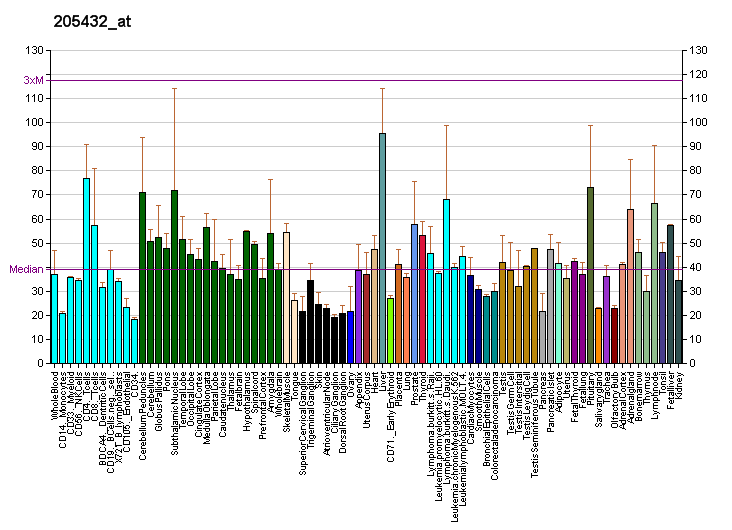
RNA expression pattern
Bgee	Human / Mouse (ortholog); Top expressed in: right uterine tube; gonad; left uterine tube; testicle; cerebellar hemisphere; right hemisphere of cerebellum; skin of leg; nasal epithelium; gastric mucosa; olfactory zone of nasal mucosa / Top expressed in: superior surface of tongue; granulocyte; cardiac muscle tissue of left ventricle; neural layer of retina; superior colliculus; cingulate gyrus; inferior colliculi; fallopian tube; paraventricular nucleus of hypothalamus; zygote; More reference expression data
BioGPS	More reference expression data
Gene ontology
Molecular function	chitinase activity; chitin binding
Cellular component	egg coat; cytosol; perivitelline space; transport vesicle; cytoplasmic vesicle; extracellular region; cytoplasm
Biological process	female pregnancy; binding of sperm to zona pellucida; negative regulation of binding of sperm to zona pellucida; single fertilization; chitin catabolic process; carbohydrate metabolic process
Sources:Amigo / QuickGO
Orthologs
Databases	NCBI: entry; OMA: entry
Species	Human	Mouse
Entrez	5016	12659
Ensembl	ENSG00000085465	ENSMUSG00000074340
UniProt	Q12889	Q62010
RefSeq (mRNA)	NM_002557	NM_007696
RefSeq (protein)	NP_002548	NP_031722
Location (UCSC)	Chr 1: 111.41 – 111.43 Mb	Chr 3: 105.88 – 105.89 Mb
PubMed search
- Wikidata
View/Edit Human	View/Edit Mouse

Oviduct-specific glycoprotein also known as oviductal glycoprotein (OGP) or estrogen-dependent oviduct protein, oviductin or mucin-9 is a protein that in humans is encoded by the OVGP1 gene.

== Function ==
Oviduct-specific glycoprotein is a large, carbohydrate-rich, epithelial glycoprotein with numerous O-glycosylation sites located within threonine, serine, and proline-rich tandem repeats. The gene is similar to members of the mucin and the glycosyl hydrolase 18 gene families. Regulation of expression may be estrogen-dependent. Gene expression and protein secretion occur during late follicular development through early cleavage-stage embryonic development. The protein is secreted from non-ciliated oviductal epithelial cells and associates with ovulated oocytes, blastomeres, and spermatozoon acrosomal regions.

Beyond the oviduct, OVGP1 is detected in the mouse ovary, testis and epididymis suggesting its roles beyond fertilization. It is not detected in the mouse uterus, cervix, vagina, breast, seminal vesicles and prostate gland OVGP1 is expressed by the surface epithelium of the endometrium at the time of embryo implantation in the mouse. It is required for maintain the receptivity phenotype and trophoblast adhesion, OVGP1 mRNA levels are reduced in endometrium of women with recurrent implantation failure.

== Sources ==
- Laheri S, Ashary N, Bhatt P, Modi D (August 2018). "Oviductal glycoprotein 1 (OVGP1) is expressed by endometrial epithelium that regulates receptivity and trophoblast adhesion". Journal of Assisted Reproduction and Genetics. 35 (8): 1419–1429. doi:10.1007/s10815-018-1231-4. PMC 6086790. PMID 29968069.
