= Mucin 20 =

Protein found in humans

MUC20

Identifiers
- Aliases: MUC20, MUC-20, mucin 20, cell surface associated
- External IDs: OMIM: 610360; MGI: 2385039; GeneCards: MUC20

Gene location (Human)
| Chr. | Chromosome 3 (human) |
| Band | 3q29 | Start | 195,720,884 bp |
| Band | 3q29 | End | 195,741,123 bp |

Gene location (Mouse)
| Chr. | Chromosome 16 (mouse) |
| Band | 16|16 B3 | Start | 32,597,793 bp |
| Band | 16|16 B3 | End | 32,617,805 bp |
RNA expression pattern
| Bgee | Human / Mouse (ortholog); Top expressed in: right uterine tube; olfactory zone of nasal mucosa; gallbladder; sural nerve; palpebral conjunctiva; minor salivary glands; rectum; mucosa of transverse colon; anterior pituitary; gastric mucosa / Top expressed in: lumbar subsegment of spinal cord; zygote; conjunctival fornix; right kidney; right ventricle; secondary oocyte; cornea; tibiofemoral joint; right lung; primary oocyte; More reference expression data |
| BioGPS | n/a |
Orthologs
| Databases | NCBI: entry; OMA: entry |
| Species | Human | Mouse |
| Entrez | 200958 | 224116 |
| Ensembl | ENSG00000274843; ENSG00000281630; ENSG00000277753; ENSG00000275501; ENSG00000275430 ENSG00000276583; ENSG00000278114; ENSG00000176945 | ENSMUSG00000035638 |
| UniProt | Q8N307 | Q8BUE7 |
| RefSeq (mRNA) | NM_152673; NM_001098516; NM_001282506; NM_001291833; NM_020790 | NM_001145874; NM_146071 |
| RefSeq (protein) | NP_001269435; NP_001278762; NP_065841; NP_689886 | NP_001139346; NP_666183 |
| Location (UCSC) | Chr 3: 195.72 – 195.74 Mb | Chr 16: 32.6 – 32.62 Mb |
| PubMed search |
- Wikidata
| View/Edit Human | View/Edit Mouse |

Mucin-20 is a protein that in humans is encoded by the MUC20 gene. This protein is a mucin, which are a family of proteins which are a component of mucus barriers.
