= Mucus =

Secretion produced by mucous membranes

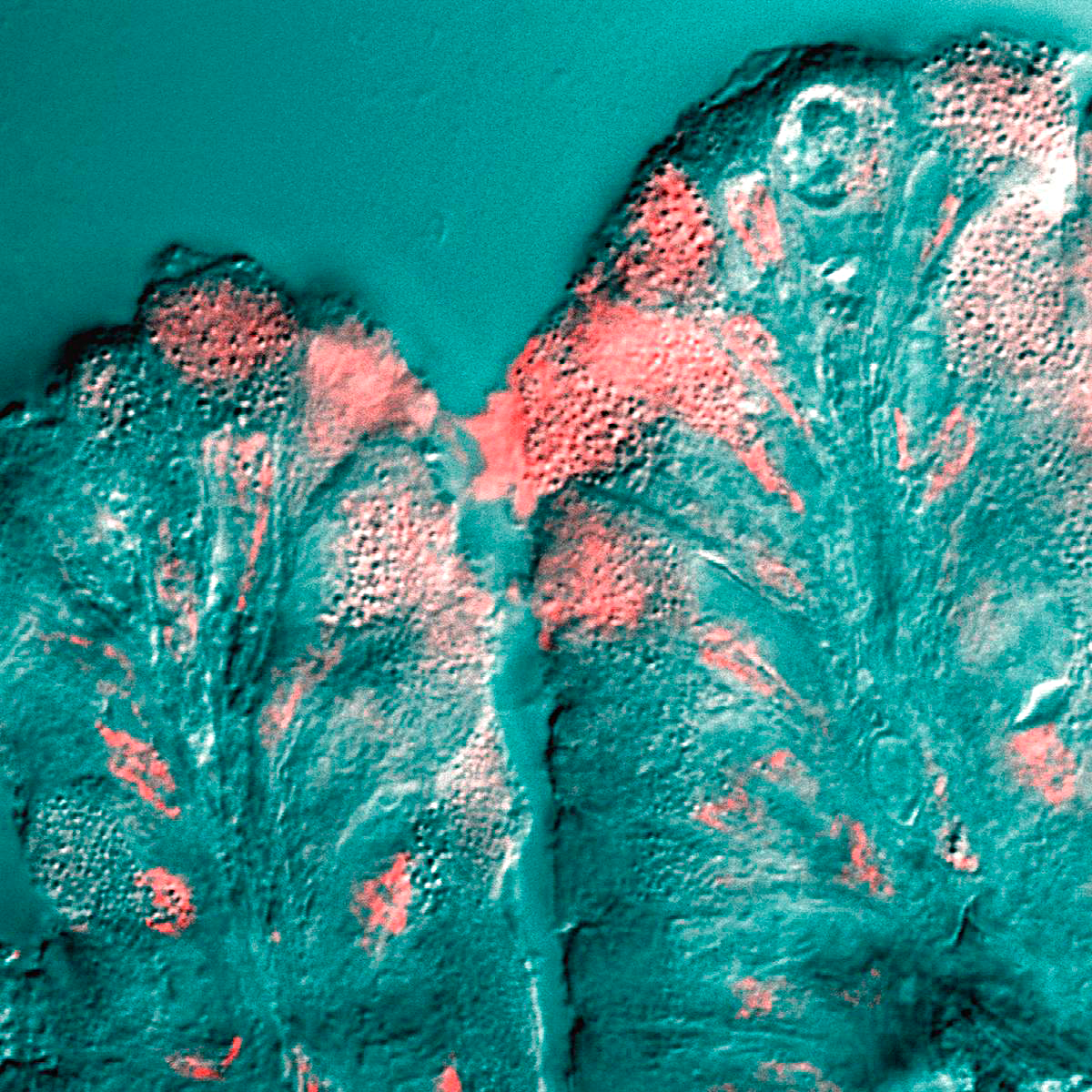
Mucous cells of the stomach lining secrete mucus (pink) into the lumen

Mucus (/ˈmjuːkəs/, MEW-kəs) is a slippery gel produced by, and covering, mucous membranes. Mucus forms a protective barrier between epithelial cells on the internal and external surfaces of the body and the outside environment. Mucus is found in the linings of the respiratory, digestive, and urogenital systems, and in the eyes and ears. Mucus helps to trap and remove inhaled particles, and prevent the entry of pathogenic fungi, bacteria and viruses at different sites. The mucosal barrier is nonetheless selectively permeable, allowing the diffusion of small particles and blocking the entrance of larger particles.

Mucus is typically produced from cells found in mucous glands, and may also originate from mixed glands which contain both serous and mucous cells. It is a viscous colloidal gel containing water (90–95%), inorganic salts, antimicrobial enzymes (such as lysozymes), antibodies (particularly immunoglobulin A), and glycoproteins such as lactoferrin and mucins, which are produced by goblet cells in the mucous membranes and submucosal glands. Most of the mucus in the body is produced in the gastrointestinal tract.

Amphibians, fish, snails, slugs, and some other invertebrates also produce external mucus from their epidermis as protection against pathogens, to help in movement, and to line fish gills. Plants, and some microorganisms produce a similar substance called mucilage.

== Properties ==
Mucus is selectively permeable, allowing the diffusion of small particles and blocking the entrance of larger particles. This filtering is based on particle size and also on surface chemistry.

== Respiratory system ==
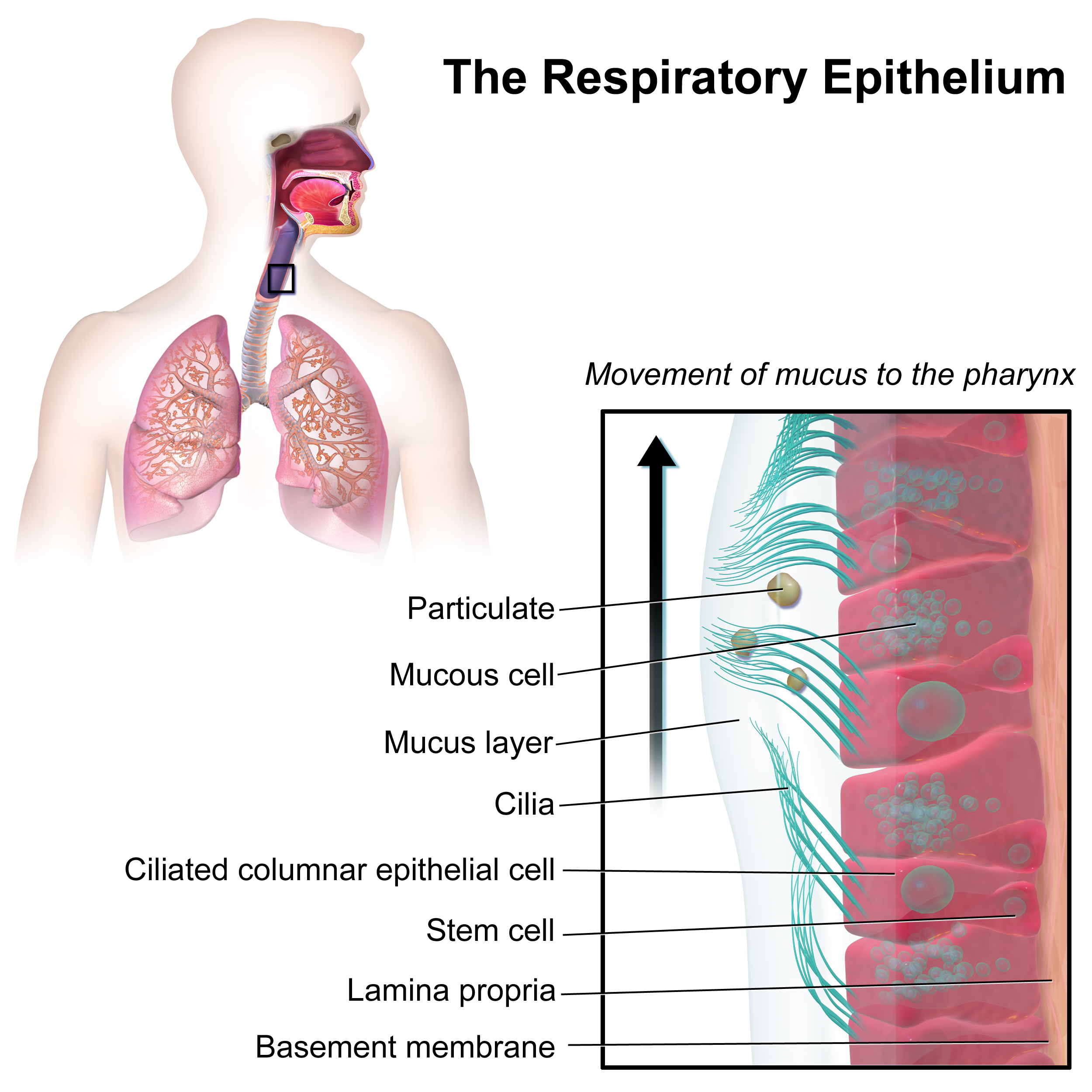
Illustration depicting the movement of mucus in the respiratory tract

In the human respiratory system, mucus is part of the airway surface liquid (ASL), also known as epithelial lining fluid (ELF), that lines most of the respiratory tract. The airway surface liquid consists of a sol layer termed the periciliary liquid layer and an overlying gel layer termed the mucus layer. The periciliary liquid layer is so named as it surrounds the cilia and lies on top of the surface epithelium. The periciliary liquid layer surrounding the cilia consists of a gel meshwork of cell-tethered mucins and polysaccharides. The mucus blanket aids in the protection of the lungs by trapping foreign particles before they can enter them, in particular through the nose during normal breathing.

Mucus is made up of a fluid component of around 95% water, the mucins secreted from goblet cells, and submucosal glands (2–3% glycoproteins), proteoglycans (0.1–0.5%), lipids (0.3–0.5%), proteins, and DNA. The major mucins secreted – MUC5AC and MUC5B - are large polymers that give the mucus its rheologic or viscoelastic properties. MUC5AC is the main gel-forming mucin secreted by goblet cells, in the form of threads and thin sheets. MUC5B is a polymeric protein secreted from submucosal glands and some goblet cells, and this is in the form of strands.

In the airways—the trachea, bronchi, and bronchioles—the lining of mucus is produced by specialized airway epithelial cells called goblet cells, and submucosal glands. Small particles such as dust, particulate pollutants, and allergens, as well as infectious agents and bacteria are caught in the viscous nasal or airway mucus and prevented from entering the system. This process, together with the continual movement of the cilia on the respiratory epithelium toward the oropharynx (mucociliary clearance), helps prevent foreign objects from entering the lungs during breathing. This explains why coughing often occurs in those who smoke cigarettes. The body's natural reaction is to increase mucus production. In addition, mucus aids in moisturizing the inhaled air and prevents tissues such as the nasal and airway epithelia from drying out.

Mucus is produced continuously in the respiratory tract. Mucociliary action carries it down from the nasal passages and up from the rest of the tract to the pharynx, with most of it being swallowed subconsciously. Sometimes in times of respiratory illness or inflammation, mucus can become thickened with cell debris, bacteria, and inflammatory cells. It is then known as phlegm which may be coughed up as sputum to clear the airway.

=== Respiratory tract ===
Increased mucus production in the upper respiratory tract is a symptom of many common ailments, such as the common cold, and influenza. Nasal mucus may be removed by blowing the nose or by using nasal irrigation. Excess nasal mucus, as with a cold or allergies, due to vascular engorgement associated with vasodilation and increased capillary permeability caused by histamines, may be treated cautiously with decongestant medications. Thickening of mucus as a "rebound" effect following overuse of decongestants may produce nasal or sinus drainage problems and circumstances that promote infection.

During cold, dry seasons, the mucus lining nasal passages tends to dry out, meaning that mucous membranes must work harder, producing more mucus to keep the cavity lined. As a result, the nasal cavity can fill up with mucus. At the same time, when air is exhaled, water vapor in breath condenses as the warm air meets the colder outside temperature near the nostrils. This causes an excess amount of water to build up inside nasal cavities. In these cases, the excess fluid usually spills out externally through the nostrils.

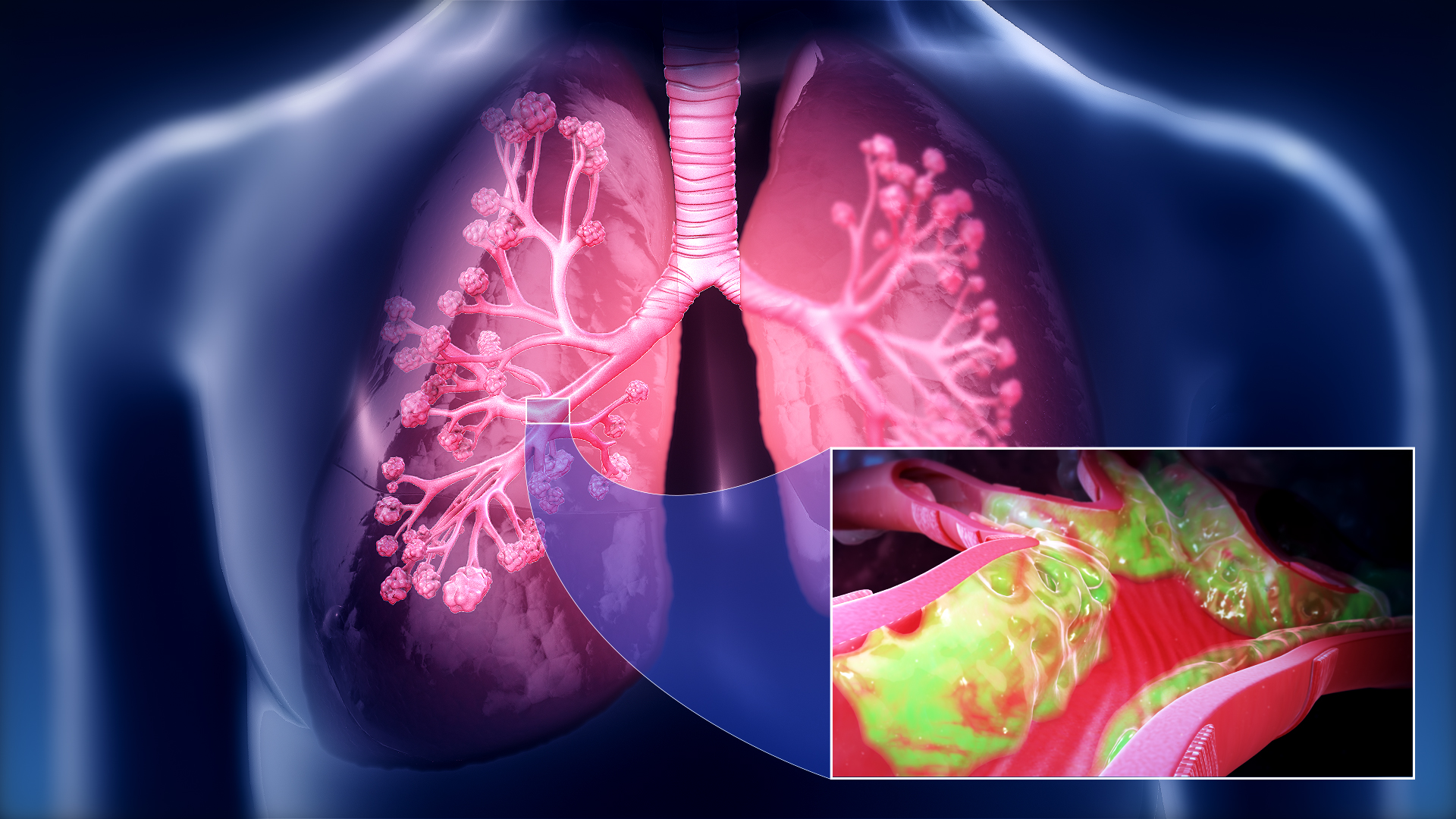
3D render showing accumulated mucus in the airways

In the lower respiratory tract impaired mucociliary clearance due to conditions such as primary ciliary dyskinesia may result in mucus accumulation in the bronchi. The dysregulation of mucus homeostasis is the fundamental characteristic of cystic fibrosis, an inherited disease caused by mutations in the CFTR gene, which encodes a chloride channel. This defect leads to the altered electrolyte composition of mucus, which triggers its hyperabsorption and dehydration. Such low-volume, viscous, acidic mucus has a reduced antimicrobial function, which facilitates bacterial colonisation. The thinning of the mucus layer ultimately affects the periciliary liquid layer, which becomes dehydrated, compromising ciliary function, and impairing mucociliary clearance. A respiratory therapist can recommend airway clearance therapy which uses a number of clearance techniques to help with the clearance of mucus.

==== Mucus hypersecretion ====
In the lower respiratory tract excessive mucus production in the bronchi and bronchioles is known as mucus hypersecretion. Chronic mucus hypersecretion results in the chronic productive cough of chronic bronchitis, and is generally synonymous with this. Excessive mucus can narrow the airways, limit airflow, and accelerate a decline in lung function.

== Digestive system ==
Gastric glands are composed of epithelial cells (B), chief cells (D), and parietal cells (E). The chief and parietal cells produce and secrete mucus (F) to protect the lining of the stomach (C) against the harsh pH of stomach acid. The mucus is basic, while the stomach acid (A) is acidic.

In the human digestive system, mucus is used as a lubricant for materials that must pass over membranes, such as food passing down the esophagus. Mucus is extremely important in the gastrointestinal tract. It forms an essential layer in the colon and in the small intestine that helps reduce intestinal inflammation by decreasing bacterial interaction with intestinal epithelial cells. The gastric glands in the gastric mucosa produce gastric juice which contains digestive enzymes and gastric acid which can damage the stomach wall. A thick layer of protective mucus is secreted by some gastric glands. This alkaline mucus lines the stomach and helps to form the gastric mucosal barrier, vital in the protection of the stomach wall.

== Reproductive system ==
In the human female reproductive system, cervical mucus prevents infection and provides lubrication during sexual intercourse. The consistency of cervical mucus varies depending on the stage of a woman's menstrual cycle. At ovulation cervical mucus is clear, runny, and conducive to sperm; post-ovulation, mucus becomes thicker and is more likely to block sperm. Several fertility awareness methods rely on observation of cervical mucus, as one of three primary fertility signs, to identify a woman's fertile time at the mid-point of the cycle. Awareness of the woman's fertile time allows a couple to time intercourse to improve the odds of pregnancy. It is also proposed as a method to avoid pregnancy.

== Clinical significance ==
In general, nasal mucus is clear and thin, serving to filter air during inhalation. During times of infection, mucus can change color to yellow or green either as a result of trapped bacteria or due to the body's reaction to viral infection. For example, Staphylococcus aureus infection may turn the mucus yellow. The green color of mucus comes from the heme group in the iron-containing enzyme myeloperoxidase secreted by white blood cells as a cytotoxic defense during a respiratory burst.

In the case of bacterial infection, the bacterium becomes trapped in already-clogged sinuses, breeding in the moist, nutrient-rich environment. Sinusitis is an uncomfortable condition that may include congestion of mucus. A bacterial infection in sinusitis will cause discolored mucus and would respond to antibiotic treatment; viral infections typically resolve without treatment. Almost all sinusitis infections are viral and antibiotics are ineffective and not recommended for treating typical cases.

In the case of a viral infection such as cold or flu, the first stage and also the last stage of the infection cause the production of a clear, thin mucus in the nose or back of the throat. As the body begins to react to the virus (generally one to three days), mucus thickens and may turn yellow or green.

Obstructive lung diseases often result from impaired mucociliary clearance that can be associated with mucus hypersecretion, and these are sometimes referred to as mucoobstructive lung diseases. Techniques of airway clearance therapy can help to clear secretions, maintain respiratory health, and prevent inflammation in the airways.

A unique umbilical cord lining epithelial stem cell expresses MUC1, termed (CLEC-muc). This has been shown to have good potential in the regeneration of the cornea.

== Properties of mucus ==
=== Tunable swelling capacity ===
Mucus is able to absorb water or dehydrate through pH variations. The swelling capacity of mucus stems from the bottlebrush structure of mucin within which hydrophilic segments provide a large surface area for water absorption. Moreover, the tunability of swelling effect is controlled by polyelectrolyte effect.

==== Polyelectrolyte effect in mucus ====
Polymers with charged molecules are called polyelectrolytes. Mucins, a kind of polyelectrolyte proteoglycans, are the main component of mucus, which provides the polyelectrolyte effect in mucus. The process of inducing this effect comprises two steps: attraction of counter-ions and water compensation. When exposed in physiological ionic solution, the charged groups in the polyelectrolytes attract counter-ions with opposite charges, thereby leading to a solute concentration gradient. An osmotic pressure is introduced to equalize the concentration of solute throughout the system by driving water to flow from the low concentration areas to the high concentration areas. In short, the influx and outflux of water within mucus, managed by the polyelectrolyte effect, contribute to mucus' tunable swelling capacity.

==== Mechanism of pH-tunable swelling ====
The ionic charges of mucin are mainly provided by acidic amino acids including aspartic acid (pKa=3.9) and glutamic acid (pKa=4.2). The charges of acidic amino acids will change with environmental pH value due to acid dissociation and association. Aspartic acid, for example, has a negative side chain when the pH value is above 3.9, while a neutrally charged side chain will be introduced as pH value drops below 3.9. Thus, the number of negative charges in mucus is influenced by the pH value of surrounding environment. That is, the polyelectrolyte effect of mucus is largely affected by the pH value of solution due to the charge variation of acidic amino acid residues on the mucin backbone. For instance, the charged residue on mucin is protonated at a normal pH value of the stomach, approximately pH 2. In this case, there is scarcely polyelectrolyte effect, thereby causing compact mucus with little swelling capacity. However, a kind of bacteria, Helicobacter pylori, is prone to producing base to elevate the pH value in stomach, leading to the deprotonation of aspartic acids and glutamic acids, i.e., from neutral to negative-charged. The negative charges in the mucus greatly increase, thus inducing the polyelectrolyte effect and the swelling of the mucus. This swelling effect increases the pore size of the mucus and decreases mucus' viscosity, which allows bacteria to penetrate and migrate into the mucus and cause disease.

== Other animals ==
Mucus is also produced by a number of other animals. All fish are covered in mucus secreted from glands all over their bodies. Invertebrates such as snails and slugs secrete mucus called snail slime to enable movement, and to prevent their bodies from drying out. Their reproductive systems also make use of mucus for example in the covering of their eggs. In the unique mating ritual of Limax maximus the mating slugs lower themselves from elevated locations by a mucus thread. Mucus is an essential constituent of hagfish slime used to deter predators. Mucus is produced by the endostyle in some tunicates and larval lampreys to help in filter feeding.

== See also ==
- Alkaline mucus
- Empty nose syndrome
- Feces
- Lung flute
- Mucoadhesion
- Mucophagy
- Sniffle
- Spinnbarkeit
