= Bovine submaxillary mucin coatings =

Surface treatment for biomaterials

Bovine submaxillary mucin

Identifiers
- Organism: Bos taurus
- Symbol: BSM1
- Orthologs: OMA: entry
- UniProt: O62672
Search for
- Structures: Swiss-model
- Domains: InterPro
- May be part of a larger MUC19 gene, which corresponds to the porcine submaxillary mucin.

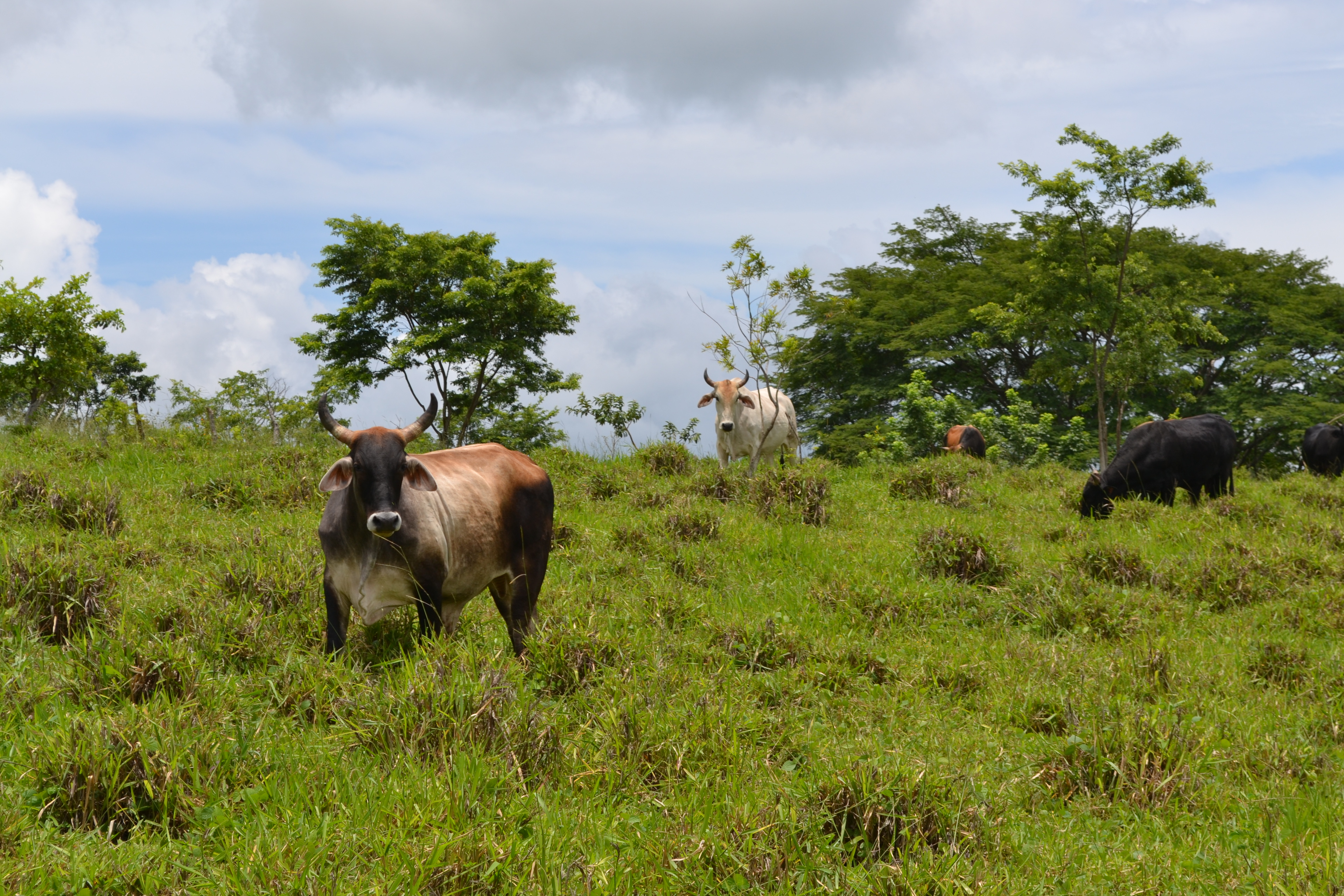
BSM can be derived from any bovine source.

Bovine submaxillary mucin (BSM) coatings are a surface treatment provided to biomaterials intended to reduce the growth of disadvantageous bacteria and fungi such as S. epidermidis, E. coli, and Candida albicans. BSM is a substance extracted from the fresh salivary glands of cows. It exhibits unique physical properties, such as high molecular weight and amphiphilicity, that allow it to be used for many biomedical applications.

Each species possesses mucin-secreting submaxillary glands. Currently, eight different mucins have been identified for humans. However, it is the mucin from bovine and porcine sources that have been used in several biomaterial applications. The most common use of BSM is in coatings for implanted materials. In such applications, the adsorption characteristics of BSM are integral to the behavior of materials in vivo. Survival and rejection of an implant are highly dependent on surface modifications that dictate the interfacial interaction between a material and the body. Thus, BSM adsorption increases biocompatibility.

Epithelial tissue lines surfaces throughout the body. A mucous gel layer composed of protein coats this tissue. The main function of the layer is protection from mechanical stress, dehydration, and bacterial infections. It also plays a role in cellular signaling, cellular interactions, and pH regulation. The two main components of the gel are mucins and water, with the mucins forming the backbone of the mucous.

Mucin originates from the mucus secretions from submaxillary glands, which are salivary glands that are located under the floor of the mouth. The secreted mucin assists in digestion by coating the bolus such that it travels easily through the digestive tract. Mucins are constituents of one class of glycoproteins: sialic acid-containing glycoproteins, or mucoproteins. They have a high molecular weight and exist as either membrane-bound or secretory mucins. The membrane-bound type have a hydrophilic area that extends along a membrane and attaches to cellular surfaces. Secretory mucins are the main components of the mucous gel layer that coats the epithelium.

== Physical characteristics ==
While mucus is mostly composed of water, its structural and rheological properties are characterized by mucin. Under an atomic force microscope, BSM appears as a composition of dumbbell shaped fibers at heights of approximately 1 nm. BSM can be purchased as a powder, in which case it appears white to light brown.

=== Mechanical properties ===
Mucin is a fibrous matrix with gel-like properties. When mixed into an aqueous solution, higher concentrations of mucin result in lower surface tension values. BSM has a hydration enthalpy of -20 kJ/mol and an RH level for glass transition of 60-70%.

Properties of Mucin from Various Species
Source of Mucin	Molecular Weight [kDa]	Γ [mg/m^{2}] after 24h adsorption to hydrophilic silica with 5 mg/ml mucin	Γ [mg/m^{2}] after 24h adsorption to hydrophobic silica with 5 mg/ml mucin
Bovine Submaxillary	4000	0.25	2
Porcine Submaxillary	500-250	1.15	2
Human Sublingual (High Molecular Weight)	>1000	-	5

Surface Properties of BSM Coated versus Non-Coated Materials
	θ, Contact Angle of Water on PMMA	γ, Surface Tension on PBS	Non-Coated	69.4±0.2°	70.2 [mN/m]
Coated	50.2±4.0°	46.5-47.3 [mN/m]			

Surface Properties of Various Solutions of Mucin and NaCl
	λ, Debye Length [nm]	κ, Adsorption [nm]	δ, Surface Density of Total Adsorbed Mucin [mg/m^{2}
Mucin 0.1 g/L + NaCl 10^{−3} M	41	0.024	2.4
Mucin 0.2 g/L + NaCl 10^{−3} M	43	0.105	4.3
Mucin 0.1 g/L + NaCl 0.15 M	41	0.024	4.5
Mucin 0.05 g/L + NaCl 0.15 M	110	0.009	2.3

=== Chemical composition ===
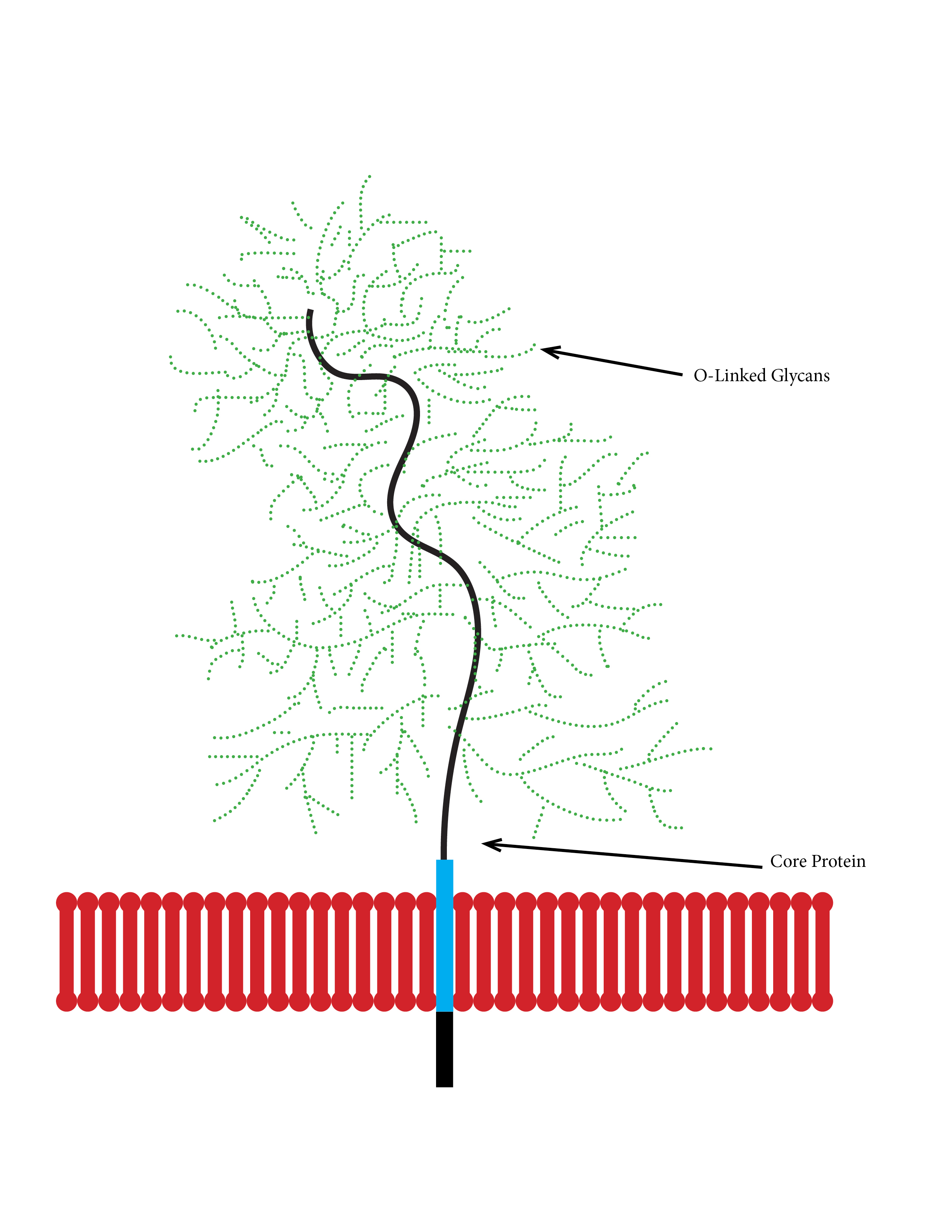
The structure of mucin is shown and includes a core protein with O-linked glycans.

Being large glycoproteins, mucins have high carbohydrate content, contributing to their fibrous structure. These carbohydrates branch off of polypeptide chains in the form of oligosaccharides including N-acetylgalactosamine, N-acetylglucosamine, fucose, galactose, and sialic acid. The serine and threonine hydroxyl groups link to the polypeptide chains via O-glycosidic linkages.

== Interaction with surfaces ==
Mucins interact with surfaces in a unique way due to the amphiphilic properties the molecules exhibit.

=== Adsorption of BSM to solid surfaces and types of bonding ===
Mucins adhere well to polymeric surfaces through various types of bonding: (1) covalent bond attachment (2) electrostatic interaction, which requires matching of charge groups between the polymer and mucus; (3) hydrogen bonding; and (4) hydrophobic interactions . These interactions require very close contact between the surface and the mucus in order to facilitate strong bonding. Most mucins adsorb to solid surfaces fairly easily without surface preparation due to the attractive interaction of the surface with the non-glycosylated region of the molecule. Surface force measurements reveal that long range steric repulsion forces exist between mucin coated surfaces and can be detected at a distance of up 100 nm or more. This indicates that mucin segments extend into the ambient solution at a long distance. Because mucin is amphiphilic, the non-glycosylated regions of the molecule interacts with the surface and the glycosylated region interacts with the ambient solution causing the steric repulsion. The repulsive forces applied by the mucin creates anti-adhesive properties which can suppress cell adhesion to surfaces.

The efficiency of mucin adherence to hydrophobic surfaces has been analyzed by applying a coating of mucin and measuring the number of mucins remaining on the hydrophobic material after rinsing. The amount of mucin removed was a small fraction of the remaining material.

A different method to determine the amount of mucin adsorption to a solid surface involves determining the refractive index of the clean solid surface and comparing that number to the refractive index with adsorbed mucin on the surface. The adsorption of mucin will alter the refractive index which can be used to calculate the amount of mucin molecules in the adsorbed layer (see equations below).

Equation to estimate the Index of Refraction:

n = n_{s} + dn/dc⋅c

n= Refractive Index

n_{s} = Refractive Index of Solvent

dn/dc= Refractive Index Increment

c= Concentrations of Dissolved Molecules

Equation to estimate the amount of molecules in the adsorbed layer:

Γ = (n − n_{s})/dn/dc⋅d

Γ= Surface Excess

n= Refractive Index

n_{s} = Refractive Index of Solvent

dn/dc= Refractive Index Increment

d= Ellipsometric Thickness

=== Hydrophobic and electrostatic interactions ===
Proteins usually readily adsorb to solid surfaces from aqueous solutions to form a protein film, typically mixed with water. Many types of interactions can mediate the adsorption; among these, hydrophobic and electrostatic interactions have been identified as central factors determining protein adsorption to surfaces and the repulsive reaction to molecules in solution. In addition, structural rearrangements of proteins as well as hydrogen bonding are suggested to influence the adsorption. The glycosylated region of mucins extend into the water which forces the molecules to extend into the ambient solution in a random coil conformation. Additionally, the high molecular weight of mucin allows the molecules to overlap and entangle when present in low concentrations.

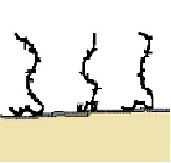
BSM adsorbs to surfaces with the chains extending outward from the adsorption site.

== pH dependence of adsorption ==
Empirical data has shown that pH has an influence on the adsorption of mucin to surfaces. At pH 4, the adsorbed amount of mucin was higher, but the thickness of the layer was lower when compared to pH 6 environments. The increased amount of mucin adsorption can be explained by the high amount of protonated amino groups that are present at the pH 4 level that form electrostatic bonds with negatively charged groups in the molecule. At lower pH values and low ionic strength, the adsorbed amount of BSM to a surface increases. the lower thickness level seen a lower pH values can be explained by a stronger attractive interaction of mucin to the surface causing the particles to deform more readily to increase amount of adsorption.

== Biocompatibility ==
Because BSM is frequently applied as a coating on a material that will interact with the human body, it is important to minimize disadvantageous interactions with tissues and cells. Two considerations include reducing tissue reactivity, as in inflammatory and immune responses, and preventing the adsorption of particles, like bacteria.

=== Tissue reactivity ===
BSM-coated polyurethane samples were implanted in sheep in order to assess if the coatings caused minimal host responses during a 30-day implantation. After inspection of the explanted samples, it was revealed that the host tissue had lower inflammatory responses and minimal capsule formation with the BSM-coated polyurethane samples than the uncoated samples. These results make the BSM coatings appealing for use in biomedical applications where synthetic materials directly interface with tissues.

Mucins are also considered useful in tissue related applications because they are natural and biological, can form hydrogels, show resistance to proteolytic degradation, and have good adhesion to surfaces while repelling molecules at the ambient solution interface. Also, the possibility to allow the uptake of certain proteins makes the BSM coatings very appealing for biomedical uses because correct protein uptake can potentially increase the recovery speed in patients.

=== Prevention of adsorbing particles ===
In the previous sections, it has been described that mucin is useful in anti-adhesive and repelling applications. This is because BSM adheres well to surfaces, but the non polar ends of the molecules that extend into the ambient solution exhibit a repulsive behavior that prevents the external particles from reaching the surface for adsorption. In the activity of preventing more adsorbed particles, the BSM layer only has to be 0.3 mg/m^2 thick to completely prevent adsorption.

== Applications ==
=== Implant coatings ===
BSM is an active area of research for several biomedical engineering applications. Due to its adsorption on solid surfaces, it is useful in vivo to prevent bacterial infections. BSM and bacteria compete for adsorption sites; mucin adhesion blocks bacterial adhesion on surfaces. Consequently, the risk of bacterial attachment and infection is reduced. While bacterial infections are common concerns in the medical, dental, and food industries, they are the primary cause of device failures in biological implants. To combat this issue, BSM has been used as a coating for a poly(acrylic acid-b-methyl methacrylate) (PAA-b-PMMA) diblock copolymer. The copolymer provides two mechanisms that contribute to the bacterial resistance of the biomaterial. First, the PAA block assists the adsorption of BSM to the surface. Second, the PMMA block prevents the dissolution of BSM in aqueous environments. This behavior is imperative in the lubrication of cardiovascular stents and urinary catheters as they are inserted within patients. Due to the adsorption of BSM, the hydrophobicity of the surface decreases as well as the incidence of bacterial adhesion.

=== Drug delivery systems ===
Drug delivery is another application that utilizes BSM coatings. Drug delivery systems employ pharmaceutical products within encapsulated compartments. These compartments are composed of hydrophilic polymers that enable the release of a particular drug at a specified rate and release profile. BSM coatings are advantageous in mucoadhesive films, which release drugs to surrounding mucosal tissue after implantation. Such delivery systems have been made specifically with PAA polymers and BSM coatings. Just like the application above, the PAA polymer improved the adsorption of BSM on its surface to prevent bacterial adhesion and potential infection. Mucin interaction with the pharmaceutical product itself and other proteins encountered in the body is vital for the drug delivery process. The behavior of BSM and drugs is investigated to ensure that one element does not disrupt the function of the other. Coatings are also synthesized, tested, and analyzed such that various proteins in the body do not adversely affect BSM adsorption and bacterial resistance.

=== Hydrogels ===
BSM has also been used for the fabrication of hydrogels. Hydrogels are crosslinked hydrophilic polymer matrices in water, which is the dispersion medium. The properties of BSM are ideal for hydrogel formation. Its glycosylated regions interact with water, forming elongated random coils. Additionally, its high molecular weight enables it to overlap at low concentrations. These synergistic behaviors create effective gel matrices that are suitable for several biomedical applications, such as scaffolds, medical electrodes, and drug delivery systems.

== See also ==
- Surface modification of biomaterials with proteins
