= Mucin 17 =

Protein-coding gene in the species Homo sapiens

MUC17

Identifiers
- Aliases: MUC17, MUC3, MUC-17, MUC-3, mucin 17, cell surface associated
- External IDs: OMIM: 608424; GeneCards: MUC17

Gene location (Human)
Chr.	Chromosome 7 (human)
Band	7q22.1	Start	101,020,072 bp
Band	7q22.1	End	101,058,859 bp
RNA expression pattern
Bgee	Human / Mouse (ortholog); Top expressed in: duodenum; rectum; testicle; transverse colon; right lobe of liver; smooth muscle tissue; appendix; sural nerve; islet of Langerhans; right lung / n/a; More reference expression data
BioGPS	n/a
Gene ontology
Molecular function	PDZ domain binding; extracellular matrix constituent, lubricant activity; protein binding
Cellular component	Golgi lumen; integral component of membrane; extracellular region; membrane; external side of plasma membrane; apical plasma membrane; plasma membrane; collagen-containing extracellular matrix
Biological process	cellular homeostasis; O-glycan processing; stimulatory C-type lectin receptor signaling pathway
Sources:Amigo / QuickGO
Orthologs
Databases	NCBI: entry; OMA: entry
Species	Human	Mouse
Entrez	140453	n/a
Ensembl	ENSG00000169876	n/a
UniProt	Q685J3	n/a
RefSeq (mRNA)	NM_001004430; NM_001040105	n/a
RefSeq (protein)	NP_001035194	n/a
Location (UCSC)	Chr 7: 101.02 – 101.06 Mb	n/a
PubMed search		n/a
- Wikidata
View/Edit Human

Mucin-17 is a protein that in humans is encoded by the MUC17 gene.

Membrane mucins, such as MUC17, function in epithelial cells to provide cytoprotection, maintain luminal structure, provide signal transduction, and confer antiadhesive properties upon cancer cells that lose their apical/basal polarization.[supplied by OMIM]
