= Mucin 5B =

Protein-coding gene in the species Homo sapiens

MUC5B

Identifiers
- Aliases: MUC5B, MG1, MUC-5B, MUC5, MUC9, mucin 5B, oligomeric mucus/gel-forming
- External IDs: OMIM: 600770; MGI: 1921430; GeneCards: MUC5B

Gene location (Human)
Chr.	Chromosome 11 (human)
Band	11p15.5	Start	1,223,066 bp
Band	11p15.5	End	1,262,172 bp

Gene location (Mouse)
Chr.	Chromosome 7 (mouse)
Band	7 F5|7 87.29 cM	Start	141,392,807 bp
Band	7 F5|7 87.29 cM	End	141,426,821 bp
RNA expression pattern
Bgee	Human / Mouse (ortholog); Top expressed in: trachea; gallbladder; mucosa of transverse colon; olfactory zone of nasal mucosa; bronchus; epithelium of bronchus; bronchial epithelial cell; tendon of biceps brachii; minor salivary glands; mucosa of sigmoid colon / Top expressed in: trachea; olfactory epithelium; right lung; cervix; right lung lobe; conjunctival fornix; cochlea; carotid body; left lung; zygote; More reference expression data
BioGPS	n/a
Gene ontology
Molecular function	protein binding
Cellular component	Golgi lumen; extracellular region; extracellular exosome; intracellular membrane-bounded organelle; plasma membrane; extracellular space
Biological process	O-glycan processing; stimulatory C-type lectin receptor signaling pathway
Sources:Amigo / QuickGO
Orthologs
Databases	NCBI: entry; OMA: entry
Species	Human	Mouse
Entrez	727897	74180
Ensembl	ENSG00000117983	ENSMUSG00000066108
UniProt	Q9HC84	n/a
RefSeq (mRNA)	NM_002458	NM_028801
RefSeq (protein)	NP_002449	n/a
Location (UCSC)	Chr 11: 1.22 – 1.26 Mb	Chr 7: 141.39 – 141.43 Mb
PubMed search
- Wikidata
View/Edit Human	View/Edit Mouse

Mucin-5B (MUC-5B) is a protein that in humans is encoded by the MUC5B gene and by the Muc5b gene in the mouse. It is one of the five gel-forming mucins. MUC-5B can be found in whole saliva, normal lung mucus, and cervical mucus. In some diseases, such as COPD, chronic rhinosinusitis (CRS), and H. pylori-associated gastric disease, the gene has been found to be upregulated, and this may be related to the pathogenesis of these conditions.

== Synthesis ==
All mucins are synthesized in secretory cells known as goblet cells or mucous cells, depending on the tissue location. Their creation, while still not completely understood, begins in the endoplasmic reticulum. From there, the Golgi apparatus builds the O-linked glycans found in mucins. Finally, they are packaged into secretory granules.
