= Mucous membrane =

Protective layer that lines the interior of hollow organs

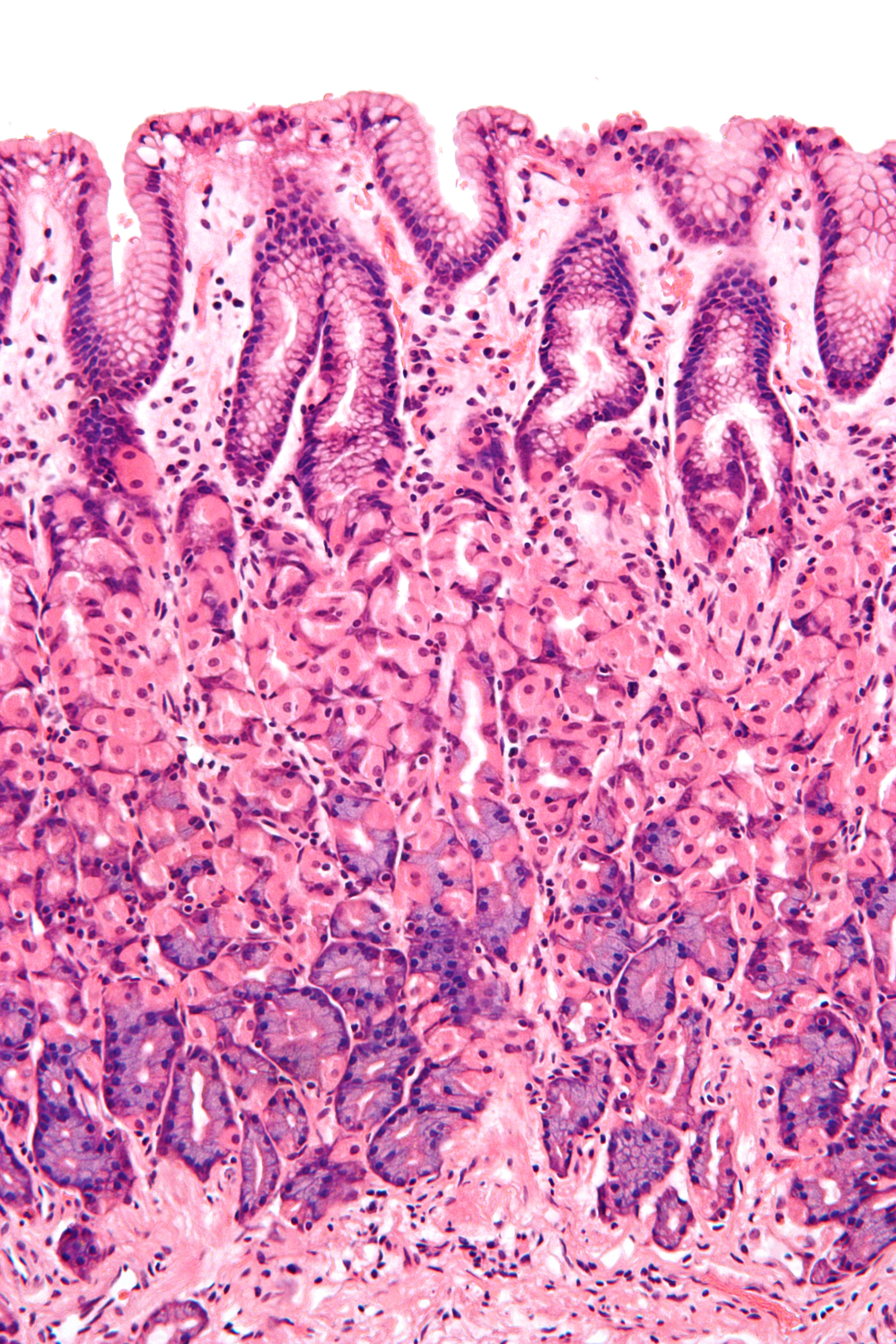
- Histological section taken from the pyloric antrum, showing the gastric mucosa

Details

Identifiers
- Latin: tunica mucosa
- MeSH: D009092
- TA98: A05.4.01.015; A05.3.01.029; A05.5.01.029; A05.6.01.009; A05.6.01.010; A05.7.01.006; A05.7.01.007; A05.8.02.009; A06.1.02.017; A06.2.09.019; A06.3.01.010; A06.4.02.029; A08.1.05.011; A08.2.01.007; A08.3.01.023; A09.1.02.013; A09.1.04.011; A09.2.03.012; A09.3.05.010; A09.3.06.004; A09.4.02.015; A09.4.02.020; A09.4.02.029; A15.3.02.083

A mucous membrane or mucosa is a membrane that lines various cavities in the body of an organism and covers the surface of internal organs. It consists of one or more layers of epithelial cells overlying a layer of loose connective tissue known as the lamina propria. It is mostly of endodermal origin and is continuous with the skin at body openings such as the eyes, eyelids, ears, inside the nose, inside the mouth, lips, the genital areas, the urethral opening and the anus. Some mucous membranes secrete mucus, a thick protective fluid. The function of the membrane is to stop pathogens and dirt from entering the body and to prevent bodily tissues from becoming dehydrated.

Amphibians, fish, snails, slugs, and some other invertebrates also produce external mucus from their epidermis as protection against pathogens, to help in movement, and to line fish gills. Plants produce a similar substance called mucilage that is also produced by some microorganisms.

== Structure ==
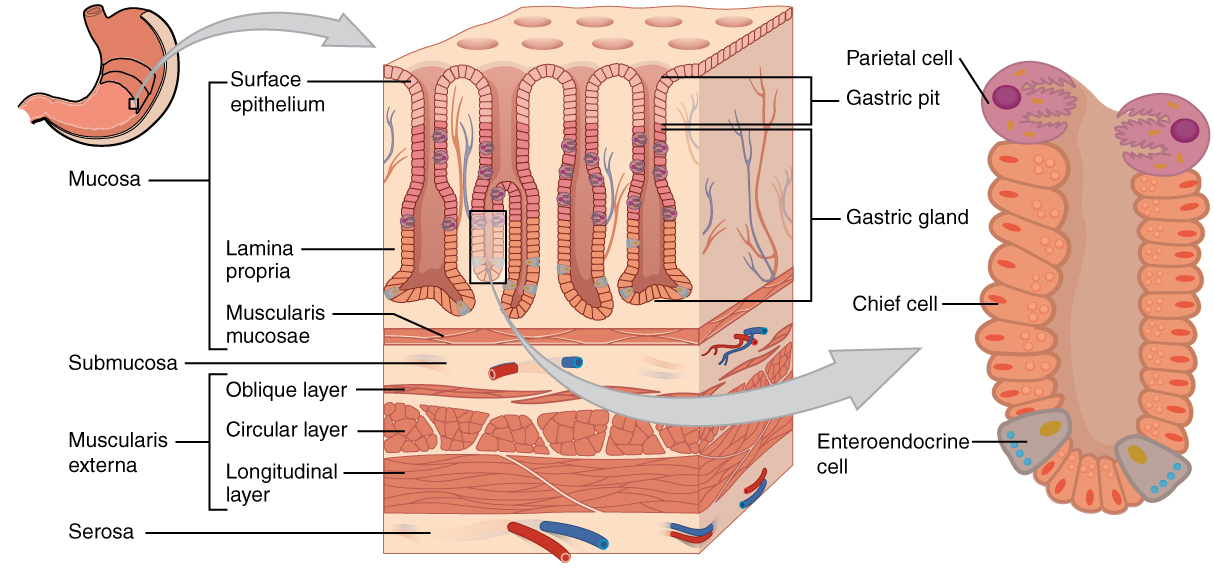
Layers of mucous membrane in stomach

The mucosa is composed of one or more layers of epithelial cells that secrete mucus, and an underlying lamina propria of loose connective tissue. The type of cells and type of mucus secreted vary from organ to organ and each can differ along a given tract.

Mucous membranes line the digestive, respiratory and reproductive tracts and are the primary barrier between the external world and the interior of the body; in an adult human the total surface area of the mucosa is about 400 square meters while the surface area of the skin is about 2 square meters. Along with providing a physical barrier, they also contain key parts of the immune system and serve as the interface between the body proper and the microbiome.

=== Examples ===
Some examples include:

- Endometrium: the mucosa of the uterus
- Gastric mucosa
- Intestinal mucosa
- Nasal mucosa
- Olfactory mucosa
- Oral mucosa
- Penile mucosa
- Respiratory mucosa
- Vaginal mucosa
- Frenulum of tongue
- Anal canal
- Conjunctiva

=== Development ===
Developmentally, the majority of mucous membranes are of endodermal origin. Exceptions include the palate, cheeks, floor of the mouth, gums, lips and the portion of the anal canal below the pectinate line, which are all ectodermal in origin.

== Function ==
One of its functions is to keep the tissue moist (for example in the respiratory tract, including the mouth and nose). It also plays a role in absorbing and transforming nutrients. Mucous membranes also protect the body from itself. For instance, mucosa in the stomach protects it from stomach acid, and mucosa lining the bladder protects the underlying tissue from urine. In the uterus, the mucous membrane is called the endometrium, and it swells each month and is then eliminated during menstruation.

=== Nutrition ===
Niacin and vitamin A are essential nutrients that help maintain mucous membranes.

== See also ==
- Alkaline mucus
- Mucin
- Mucociliary clearance
- Mucocutaneous boundary
- Mucosal immunology
  - Mucosal-associated invariant T cell
- Mucosal melanoma
- Rete pegs
- Epimysium
