= Mucin 5AC =

Protein-coding gene in the species Homo sapiens

MUC5AC

Identifiers
- Aliases: MUC5AC, MUC5, TBM, leB, mucin, mucin 5AC, oligomeric mucus/gel-forming
- External IDs: OMIM: 158373; MGI: 104697; GeneCards: MUC5AC
Available structures
PDB	Human UniProt search: PDBe RCSB
PDB	List of PDB id codes 5AJN, 5AJP, 5AJO

Gene location (Human)
Chr.	Chromosome 11 (human)
Band	11p15.5	Start	1,157,953 bp
Band	11p15.5	End	1,201,138 bp

Gene location (Mouse)
Chr.	Chromosome 7 (mouse)
Band	7 F5|7 87.23 cM	Start	141,342,709 bp
Band	7 F5|7 87.23 cM	End	141,372,968 bp
RNA expression pattern
Bgee	Human / Mouse (ortholog); Top expressed in: olfactory zone of nasal mucosa; gastric mucosa; body of stomach; fundus; gallbladder; canal of the cervix; islet of Langerhans; appendix; urinary bladder; muscle tissue / Top expressed in: pyloric antrum; epithelium of stomach; mucous cell of stomach; conjunctival fornix; duodenum; olfactory epithelium; quadriceps femoris muscle; esophagus; cornea; pancreas; More reference expression data
BioGPS	n/a
Gene ontology
Molecular function	extracellular matrix structural constituent
Cellular component	cytoplasm; Golgi lumen; extracellular region; extracellular exosome; extracellular space; plasma membrane; mucus layer
Biological process	phosphatidylinositol-mediated signaling; O-glycan processing; stimulatory C-type lectin receptor signaling pathway
Sources:Amigo / QuickGO
Orthologs
Databases	NCBI: entry; OMA: entry
Species	Human	Mouse
Entrez	4586	17833
Ensembl	ENSG00000215182; ENSG00000283158	ENSMUSG00000037974
UniProt	P98088	n/a
RefSeq (mRNA)	NM_017511; NM_001304359	NM_010844
RefSeq (protein)	NP_001291288	n/a
Location (UCSC)	Chr 11: 1.16 – 1.2 Mb	Chr 7: 141.34 – 141.37 Mb
PubMed search
- Wikidata
View/Edit Human	View/Edit Mouse

Mucin-5AC (MUC-5AC) is a protein that is encoded by the MUC5AC gene in humans.

MUC-5AC is a large gel-forming glycoprotein. In the respiratory tract, it protects against infection by binding to inhaled pathogens, which are subsequently removed by mucociliary clearance. Overproduction of MUC-5AC can contribute to diseases such as asthma and chronic obstructive pulmonary disease, and has also been associated with greater protection against influenza infection.

== Clinical relevance ==
This gene has been linked to mucus hypersecretion in the respiratory tract and is associated to chronic obstructive pulmonary disease (COPD).
