= Otogelin =

Protein-coding gene in the species Homo sapiens

OTOG

Identifiers
- Aliases: OTOG, DFNB18B, MLEMP, OTGN, otogelin
- External IDs: OMIM: 604487; MGI: 1202064; GeneCards: OTOG

Gene location (Human)
Chr.	Chromosome 11 (human)
Band	11p15.1	Start	17,547,259 bp
Band	11p15.1	End	17,647,150 bp

Gene location (Mouse)
Chr.	Chromosome 7 (mouse)
Band	7 B3|7 29.66 cM	Start	45,890,411 bp
Band	7 B3|7 29.66 cM	End	45,960,858 bp
RNA expression pattern
Bgee	Human / Mouse (ortholog); Top expressed in: gonad; ventricular zone; ganglionic eminence; right testis; left testis; pituitary gland; granulocyte; anterior pituitary; superior frontal gyrus; prefrontal cortex / Top expressed in: saccule; utricle; vestibular sensory epithelium; otic vesicle; vestibular membrane of cochlear duct; otic placode; cochlea; epithelium of macula of saccule of membranous labyrinth; muscle of thigh; morula; More reference expression data
BioGPS	n/a
Gene ontology
Molecular function	structural molecule activity; alpha-L-arabinofuranosidase activity
Cellular component	extracellular region; plasma membrane; apical plasma membrane; membrane; extracellular space
Biological process	adult locomotory behavior; hearing; L-arabinose metabolic process
Sources:Amigo / QuickGO
Orthologs
Databases	NCBI: entry; OMA: entry
Species	Human	Mouse
Entrez	340990	18419
Ensembl	ENSG00000188162	ENSMUSG00000009487
UniProt	Q6ZRI0	O55225
RefSeq (mRNA)	NM_198497; NM_001277269; NM_001292063	NM_013624
RefSeq (protein)	NP_001264198; NP_001278992	NP_038652
Location (UCSC)	Chr 11: 17.55 – 17.65 Mb	Chr 7: 45.89 – 45.96 Mb
PubMed search
- Wikidata
View/Edit Human	View/Edit Mouse

Otogelin is a protein that in humans is encoded by the OTOG gene.

== Function ==
The protein encoded by this gene is a component of the acellular membranes of the inner ear. Disruption of the orthologous mouse gene shows that it plays a role in auditory and vestibular functions. It is involved in fibrillar network organization, the anchoring of otoconial membranes and cupulae to the neuroepithelia, and likely in sound stimulation resistance. Mutations in this gene cause autosomal recessive nonsyndromic deafness, type 18B. Alternative splicing of this gene results in multiple transcript variants. [provided by RefSeq, May 2014].

== Deafness ==
If people don't have otogelin or otogelin-like they are born with mild or moderate deafness.
