= Valentino's syndrome =

Type of abdominal pain

Valentino's syndrome is pain presenting in the right lower quadrant of the abdomen caused by a duodenal ulcer with perforation through the retroperitoneum.

It is named after Rudolph Valentino, an Italian actor, who presented with right lower quadrant pain in New York, which turned out to be a perforated peptic ulcer. He subsequently died from an infection and organ dysfunction in spite of surgery to repair the perforation. Due to his popularity, his case received much attention at the time and is still considered a rare medical condition.

However, the degree of peritoneal findings is strongly influenced by a number of factors, including the size of perforation, amount of bacterial and gastric contents contaminating the abdominal cavity, time between perforation and presentation, and spontaneous sealing of perforation.

== Signs and symptoms ==
Patients with perforated peptic ulcer usually present with a sudden onset of severe, sharp abdominal pain in the right lower quadrant (RLQ), that is similar to acute appendicitis. Most patients describe generalized pain; a few present with severe epigastric pain, located in the upper abdominal area. As even slight movement can tremendously worsen their pain, these patients assume a fetal position. These patients may also demonstrate signs and symptoms of septic shock, such as tachycardia (increased heart rate), hypotension (low blood pressure), and anuria (when no urine is produced from the kidneys). Not surprisingly, these indicators of shock may be absent in elderly, immunocompromised patients or in those with diabetes. Patients also experience nausea, vomiting, decreased appetite, and sweating.

== Cause ==
The cause for Valentino's syndrome is a perforated ulcer located in the duodenum. This occurs when ulcers that have gone untreated for long periods of time, and as a result has burned through the stomach wall. Risk factors for a perforated ulcers include bacterial infection, such as H. pylori, and routine use of nonsteroidal anti-inflammatory drugs. The right lower quadrant pain is caused by peritonitis from exposure to gastrointestinal fluids draining down from the perforation in the right upper quadrant. The exact incidence of Valentino's syndrome is unknown.

== Pathophysiology ==
Peptic ulcers are sores or defects that arise from tissue death, that develop in the mucosal lining of the stomach or duodenum. When a peptic ulcer bursts, the gastrointestinal or duodenal fluid leaks through it and pools in the right paracolic gutter which leads to inflammation of the peritoneum resulting in symptoms right lower quadrant of abdominal pain. Patients also develop pneumoretroperitoneum, which is air in the retroperitoneum, caused by intraperitoneal perforation in the duodenum. Untreated peptic ulcers can often lead to greater complications such as hemorrhage, obstruction, and cancer.

== Diagnosis ==
Diagnosing Valentino's syndrome could be very difficult because of the condition's many similarities to appendicitis. However, a medical history of ulcers and use of NSAIDs could be an indicator.

When patients present with right lower quadrant pain their vitals, such as blood pressure, pulse, oxygen saturation, and temperature, are monitored. A complete blood count (CBC) is done to determine the number of white blood cells present in the patient's blood and test for leukocytosis, a condition in which the white blood cells are above the normal levels.

Abdominal examination usually discloses generalized tenderness, rebound tenderness in the right iliac fossa, guarding, and rigidity. A physical examination that is positive for abdominal pain categorized as McBurney's point tenderness, Blumberg's sign, Rovsing's sign, Dunphy's sign and psoas sign, could all indicate acute appendicitis and lead to misdiagnosis. However, these physical examination findings are also present in Valentino's Syndrome.

In order to diagnose Valentino's syndrome, a CT or ultrasound may be performed, which would reveal a ruptured peptic ulcer and free fluid surrounding the area of the appendix. Diagnosis through laparoscopy can also be done to distinguish between acute appendicitis and Valentino's syndrome.

Since there has been very few cases of Valentino's syndrome recorded to this day, most studies on this condition include observations of the patient from onset to recovery and on site medical decision making.

== Treatment ==
Treatment would include emergency surgery in order to repair the ruptured peptic ulcer. This is done by irrigation with saline solution, draining excess fluid, and surgically closing the perforation. Patients are then observed for a certain period of time before being discharged when no post-operative complications arise and are advised to follow up with their physician for post-operative examination.
