= Hamburger sign =

Sign used in the diagnosis of appendicitis

The hamburger sign is used in the diagnosis of appendicitis. The sign is used to rule out that disease, with the physician inquiring if the patient would like to consume their favourite food. If a patient wants to eat, diagnoses other than appendicitis should be considered. Anorexia is 80% sensitive for appendicitis. A positive hamburger sign is demonstrated by a patient declining food.

== See also ==
- Blumberg's sign
- Obturator sign
- Psoas sign
- Rovsing's sign
- McBurney's point
