= Rovsing =

Rovsing is a Danish surname. Notable people with the surname include:

- Christian Rovsing (1936–2025), Danish politician
- Leif Rovsing (1887–1977), Danish tennis player
- Marie Rovsing (1814–1888), Danish women's rights activist
- Niels Thorkild Rovsing (1862–1927), Danish surgeon

== See also ==
- Poul Rovsing Olsen (1922–1982), Danish composer and ethnomusicologist
- Rovsing's sign, a sign of appendicitis, named after Niels Thorkild Rovsing
