= Heel tap sign =

Clinical sign to identify appendicitis

- Differential diagnosis: appendicitis

Heel tap sign, also called heel-jar or jar tenderness, is a clinical sign to identify appendicitis. It is found in patients with localized peritonitis. With the patient supine the right heel is elevated by 10-20 degrees is hit firmly with palm of the examiner's hand.

The prehospital equivalent of this sign is when pain is elicited as the ambulance hits bumps and potholes during the transport of the patient. Pain may be severe and may radiate to other areas with movement.

It is similar to rebound tenderness, but may be easier to elicit when the patient has firm abdominal wall muscles. Abdominal pain on walking or running is an equivalent sign.
