= Abdominal trauma =

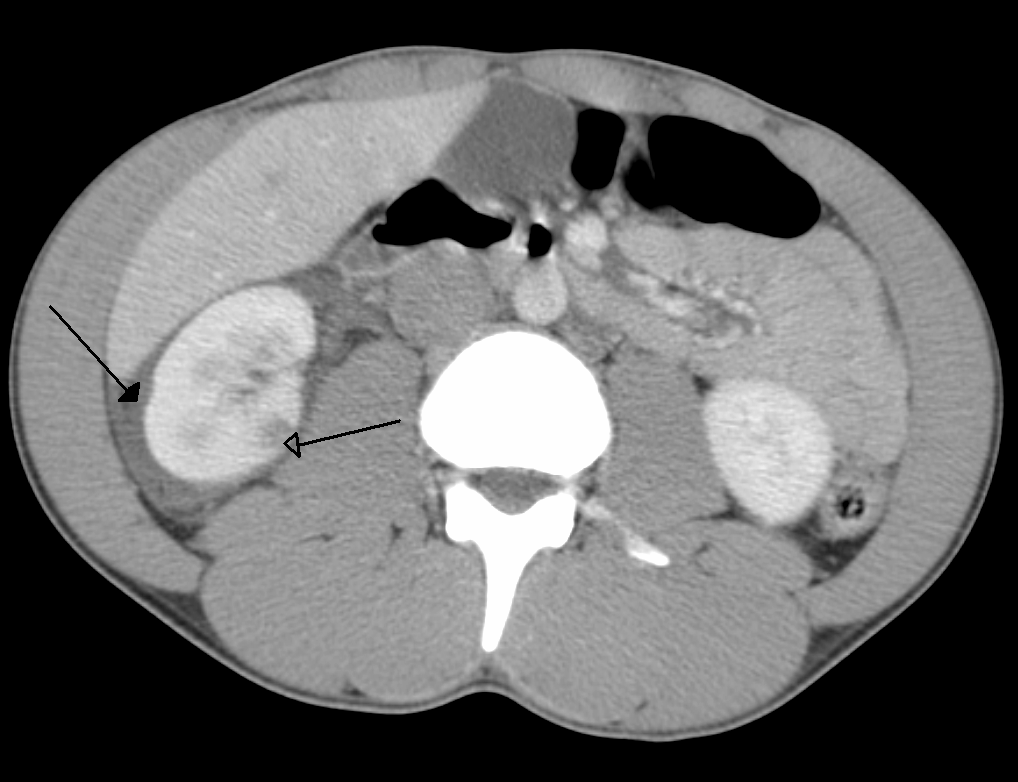
- Abdominal trauma resulting in a right kidney contusion (open arrow) and blood surrounding the kidney (closed arrow) as seen on CT
- Specialty: Emergency medicine

Abdominal trauma is an injury to the abdomen. Signs and symptoms include abdominal pain, tenderness, rigidity, and bruising of the external abdomen. Complications may include blood loss and infection.

Diagnosis may involve ultrasonography, computed tomography, and peritoneal lavage, and treatment may involve surgery. It is divided into two types, blunt or penetrating, and may involve damage to the abdominal organs. Injury to the lower chest may cause splenic or liver injuries.

== Signs and symptoms ==
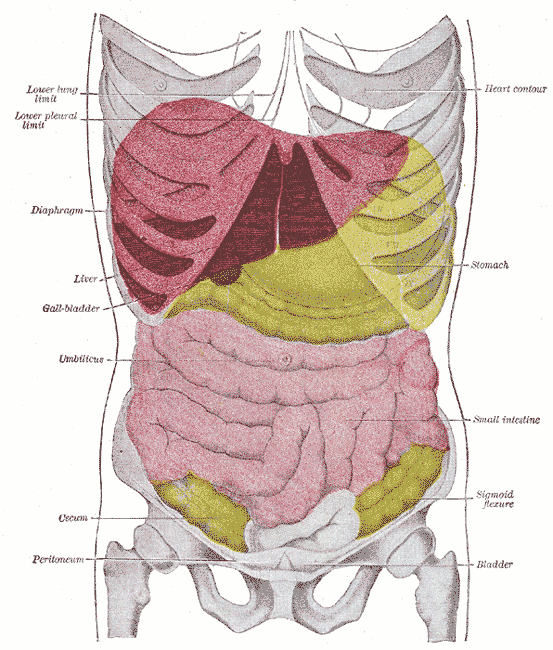
The abdominal organs

Signs and symptoms are not seen in early days and after some days initial pain is seen. People injured in motor vehicle collisions may present with a "seat belt sign", bruising on the abdomen along the site of the lap portion of the safety belt; this sign is associated with a high rate of injury to the abdominal organs. Seatbelts may also cause abrasions and hematomas; up to 30 percent of people with such signs have associated internal injuries. Early indications of abdominal trauma include nausea, vomiting, blood in the urine, and fever. The injury may present with abdominal pain, tenderness, distension, or rigidity to the touch, and bowel sounds may be diminished or absent. Abdominal guarding is a tensing of the abdominal wall muscles to guard inflamed organs within the abdomen. Pneumoperitoneum, air or gas in the abdominal cavity, may be an indication of rupture of a hollow organ. In penetrating injuries, an evisceration (protrusion of internal organs out of a wound) may be present.

Injuries associated with intra-abdominal trauma include rib fractures, vertebral fractures, pelvic fractures, and injuries to the abdominal wall.

== Causes ==
Motor vehicle collisions are a common source of blunt abdominal trauma. Seat belts reduce the incidence of injuries such as head injury and chest injury, but present a threat to such abdominal organs as the pancreas and the intestines, which may be displaced or compressed against the spinal column. Children are especially vulnerable to abdominal injury from seat belts, because they have softer abdominal regions and seat belts were not designed to fit them. In children, bicycle mishaps are also a common cause of abdominal injury, especially when the abdomen is struck by the handlebars. Sports injuries can affect abdominal organs such as the spleen and kidneys. Falls and sports are also frequent mechanisms of abdominal injury in children. Abdominal injury may result from child abuse and is the second leading cause of child abuse-related death, after traumatic brain injury.

Gunshot wounds, which are higher energy than stab wounds, are usually more damaging than the latter. Gunshot wounds that penetrate the peritoneum result in significant damage to major intra-abdominal structures in some 90 percent of cases.

== Pathophysiology ==
Abdominal trauma can be life-threatening because abdominal organs, especially those in the retroperitoneal space, can bleed profusely, and the space can hold a great deal of blood. Solid abdominal organs, such as the liver and kidneys, bleed profusely when cut or torn, as do major blood vessels such as the aorta and vena cava. Hollow organs such as the stomach, while not as likely to result in shock from profuse bleeding, present a serious risk of infection, especially if such an injury is not treated promptly. Gastrointestinal organs such as the bowel can spill their contents into the abdominal cavity. Hemorrhage and systemic infection are the main causes of deaths that result from abdominal trauma.

One or more of the intra-abdominal organs may be injured in abdominal trauma. The characteristics of the injury are determined in part by which organ or organs are injured.

=== Liver ===
The liver, the most vulnerable abdominal organ to all forms of injury because of its size and location (in the upper right quadrant of the abdomen), is injured in about five percent of all people admitted to a hospital for trauma. In autopsy series of fatal blunt abdominal trauma, the liver is often the most frequently injured organ; one Indian series found liver involvement in 52.4% of cases, most commonly as lacerations, followed by perirenal hematoma (28.6%) and splenic injury (23.8%). Liver injuries present a serious risk for shock because the liver tissue is delicate and has a large blood supply and capacity. The liver may be lacerated or contused, and a hematoma may develop. It may leak bile, usually without serious consequences. If severely injured, the liver may cause exsanguination (bleeding to death), requiring emergency surgery to stop the bleeding.

=== Spleen ===
The spleen is the most common cause of massive bleeding in blunt abdominal trauma to a solid organ. The spleen is the most commonly injured organ. A laceration of the spleen may be associated with hematoma. Because of the spleen's ability to bleed profusely, a ruptured spleen can be life-threatening, resulting in shock. However, unlike the liver, penetrating trauma to the spleen, pancreas and kidneys do not present as much of an immediate threat of shock unless they lacerate a major blood vessel supplying the organs, such as the renal artery. Fractures of the left lower ribs are associated with spleen lacerations in 20 percent of cases.

=== Pancreas ===
The pancreas may be injured in abdominal trauma, for example by laceration or contusion. Pancreatic injuries, most commonly caused by bicycle accidents (especially by impact with the handlebars) in children and vehicular accidents in adults, usually occur in isolation in children and accompanied by other injuries in adults. Indications that the pancreas is injured include enlargement and the presence of fluid around the pancreas.

=== Kidneys ===
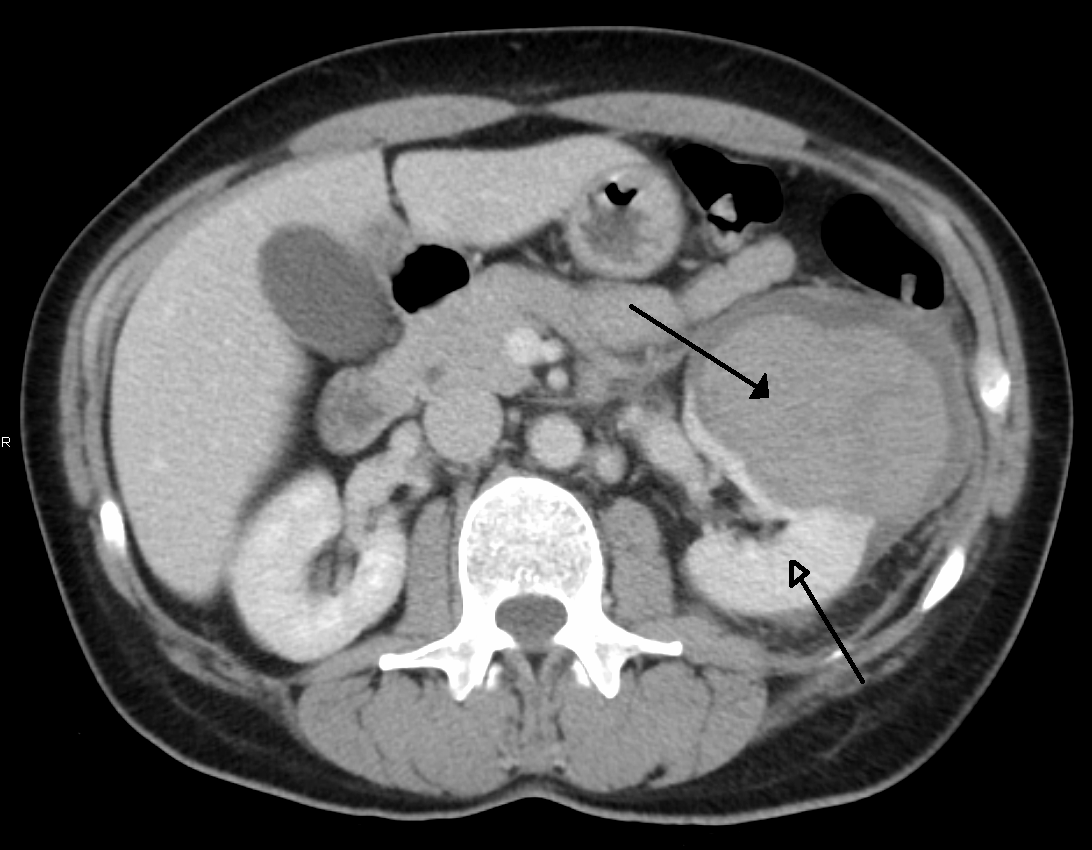
A large hematoma (closed arrow) of the left kidney (open arrow)

The kidneys may also be injured; they are somewhat but not completely protected by the ribs. Kidney lacerations and contusions may also occur. Kidney injury, a common finding in children with blunt abdominal trauma, may be associated with bloody urine. Kidney lacerations may be associated with urinoma or leakage of urine into the abdomen. A shattered kidney is one with multiple lacerations and an associated fragmentation of the kidney tissue.

=== Bowel ===
The small intestine takes up a large part of the abdomen and is likely to be damaged in penetrating injury. The bowel may be perforated. Gas within the abdominal cavity seen on CT is understood to be a diagnostic sign of bowel perforation; however intra-abdominal air can also be caused by pneumothorax (air in the pleural cavity outside the lungs that has escaped from the respiratory system) or pneumomediastinum (air in the mediastinum, the center of the chest cavity). The injury may not be detected on CT. Bowel injury may be associated with complications such as infection, abscess, bowel obstruction, and the formation of a fistula. Bowel perforation requires surgery.

== Diagnosis ==
Pneumoperitoneum, seen as an air bubble on the lower left side of the X-ray film

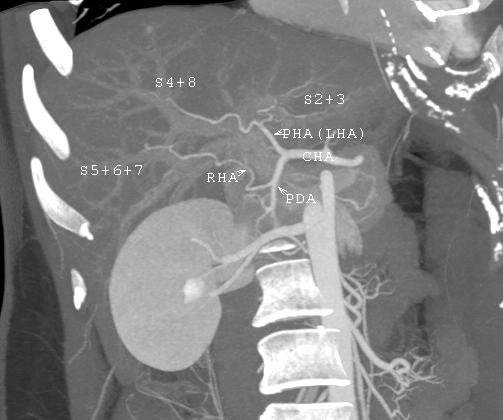
CT scan showing the liver and a kidney

Ten percent of people with polytrauma who had no signs of abdominal injury did have evidence of such injuries using radiological imaging. Internal injury may also be present without any external mark on the abdomen: in the Indian autopsy series of fatal blunt abdominal trauma, 64 of 185 cases (34.6%) had internal organ injury despite no external abdominal injury, and the authors recommended systematic internal examination of the abdomen at autopsy regardless of external findings. Diagnostic techniques used include CT scanning, ultrasound, and X-ray. X-ray can help determine the path of a penetrating object and locate any foreign matter left in the wound, but may not be helpful in blunt trauma. Diagnostic laparoscopy or exploratory laparotomy may also be performed if other diagnostic methods do not yield conclusive results.

=== Ultrasound ===
Ultrasound can detect fluid such as blood or gastrointestinal contents in the abdominal cavity, and it is a noninvasive procedure and relatively safe. CT scanning is the preferred technique for people who are not at immediate risk of shock, but since ultrasound can be performed right in an emergency room, the latter is recommended for people who are not stable enough to move to CT scanning. A normal ultrasound does not rule out all injuries.

=== CT ===
People with abdominal trauma frequently need CT scans for other trauma (for example, head or chest CT); in these cases abdominal CT can be performed at the same time without wasting time in patient care.

CT is able to detect 76% of hollow viscous injuries so people who have negative scans are often observed and rechecked if they deteriorate. However, CT has been demonstrated to be useful in screening people with certain forms of abdominal trauma in order to avoid unnecessary laparotomies, which can significantly increase the cost and length of hospitalizations. A meta-analysis of CT use in penetrating abdominal traumas demonstrated sensitivity, specificity and accuracy >= 95%, with a PPV of 85% and an NPV of 98%.

=== Peritoneal lavage ===
Diagnostic peritoneal lavage is a controversial technique but can be used to detect injury to abdominal organs: a catheter is placed in the peritoneal cavity, and if fluid is present, it is aspirated and examined for blood or evidence of organ rupture. If this does not reveal evidence of injury, sterile saline is infused into the cavity and evacuated and examined for blood or other material. While peritoneal lavage is an accurate way to test for bleeding, it carries a risk of injuring the abdominal organs, may be difficult to perform, and may lead to unnecessary surgery; thus it has largely been replaced by ultrasound in Europe and North America.

=== Classification ===
Abdominal trauma is divided into blunt and penetrating types. While penetrating abdominal trauma (PAT) is usually diagnosed based on clinical signs, diagnosis of blunt abdominal trauma is more likely to be delayed or altogether missed because clinical signs are less obvious. Blunt injuries predominate in rural areas, while penetrating ones are more frequent in urban settings. Penetrating trauma is further subdivided into stab wounds and gunshot wounds, which require different methods of treatment.

== Treatment ==
Abdominal trauma requires urgent medical attention and sometimes requires hospitalization. The initial treatment involves stabilizing the person enough to ensure adequate airway, breathing, and circulation, and identifying other injuries. Surgery may be needed to repair injured organs. Surgical exploration may be necessary for people with penetrating injuries and signs of peritonitis or shock. Laparotomy is often performed in blunt abdominal trauma, and is urgently required if an abdominal injury causes a large, potentially deadly bleed. The main goal is to stop any sources of bleeding before moving onto any definitive find and repair any injuries that are found. Due to the time sensitive nature, this procedure also emphasizes expedience in terms of gaining access and controlling the bleeding, thus favoring a long midline incision. Intra-abdominal injuries are also frequently successfully treated nonoperatively as there is little benefit shown if there is no known active bleeding or potential for infection. The use of CT scanning allows care providers to use less surgery because they can identify injuries that can be managed conservatively and rule out other injuries that would need surgery. Depending on the injuries, a person may or may not need intensive care.

For injuries that penetrate the peritoneal cavity (penetrating abdominal trauma), prophylactic (preventative) antibiotics are often administered with the goal of reducing the risk of sepsis and septic complications, including septicaemia, abscesses in the abdomen, and wound infections. The effectiveness of the use of antibiotics prophylactically for penetrating abdominal trauma has not been well studied and there is no strong evidence to support one particular antibiotic type or dose over another. The length of time that these antibiotics should be used for is also not clear.

== Prognosis ==
If abdominal injury is not diagnosed promptly, a worse outcome is associated. Delayed treatment is associated with an especially high morbidity and mortality if perforation of the gastrointestinal tract is involved.

== Epidemiology ==
In the United Kingdom, abdominal trauma due to road traffic accidents and assaults are most common. This situation is reversed in South Africa and United States where firearms related trauma are the most common.

In India, an autopsy-based study of 185 fatal cases of blunt abdominal trauma at a tertiary forensic center in Thiruvananthapuram, Kerala (2016–2017), found that road traffic collisions accounted for 70.3% of cases, with motorcyclists the largest single group (35.1% of all cases), followed by pedestrians, falls from height and railway accidents. Most of those affected were young to middle-aged men (88.6% male; mean age 42.3 years), and about half died at the scene.

Most deaths resulting from abdominal trauma are preventable; abdominal trauma is one of the most common causes of preventable, trauma-related deaths.
