= Markle's sign =

Clinical sign to identify appendicitis

- Differential diagnosis: acute appendicitis

Markle's sign, or jar tenderness, is a clinical sign in which pain in the right lower quadrant of the abdomen is elicited by the heel-drop test (dropping to the heels, from standing on the toes, with a jarring landing).

It is found in patients with localised peritonitis due to acute appendicitis. It is similar to rebound tenderness, but may be easier to elicit when the patient has firm abdominal wall muscles. Abdominal pain on walking or running is an equivalent sign.

It was first described by the George Bushar Markle IV (1921–1999), an American surgeon, in 1985.
