= Scratch test (disambiguation) =

A Scratch test may refer to:

- The skin allergy test used in the medical diagnosis of allergies
- Scratch hardness tests, such as Mohs scale of mineral hardness, used to measure the scratch resistance of various minerals
- Liver scratch test, used by medical professionals to ascertain the location and size of a patient's liver during a physical assessment
- Apley scratch test, a medical test for limitations in motions of the upper extremity measured during a shoulder examination
