= Jacob Moritz Blumberg =

Jacob Moritz Blumberg (27 June 1873 – 1955) was a German Jewish surgeon and gynaecologist and inventor and namesake of Blumberg's sign.

== Life and work ==
Blumberg was born in the Province of Posen and educated at the University of Breslau (Wrocław) where he received his doctorate in 1896. He went on to complete further training with Polish surgeon Jan Mikulicz-Radecki at the surgical clinic in Breslau, under German physician Albert Ludwig Sigesmund Neisser, the discoverer of Neisseria gonorrhoeae, at the dermatological clinic, and under German physician Albert Fränkel at the women's clinic. He also trained with Paul Zweifel at the women's clinic in Leipzig. trained with Paul Zweifel and invented Blumberg's sign.

Blumberg began his professional career in Berlin where he specialised in gynaecology and surgery. Early in his career he invented the Blumberg sign to indicate peritonitis. Investigating methods of sterilisation of the surgeon's hands resulted in his invention of a type of rubber glove that was widely adopted by his medical colleagues. World War I required him to fight with the German army and he successfully brought a typhus epidemic in a prisoner of war camp under control by delousing 10.000 Russian POWs in a few days. He was awarded the Iron Cross and received decorations from several other countries.

After the war, Blumberg resumed his surgical practice and organised many prenatal care clinics in Berlin, one of which was the Beulah Clinic which Blumberg personally directed. He also began working in the new fields of radiology and radium therapy and founded an X-ray and radium institute in Berlin. With the rise of the Nazi Party he left Germany and moved to Belsize Park, London, England where he successfully continued his medical work and where his portrait was painted by the renowned artist Arthur Pan. In 1935 he had obtained a quantity of radium from the Curie Institute, founded by Marie Curie in Paris, to help set up his elder son Ernst Friedrich Blumberg's practice in London. This work resulted in Ernst writing the treatise Health through radium therapy in 1950.

Blumberg married Charlotte Haas and they had two sons. The elder son Ernst Friedrich Blumberg M.D. (1908–1973) was also a notable surgeon, gynaecologist and radium therapist who married the Canadian artist Marion Harding in 1960, London, England.

== Notes ==
- Eponyms and the Nazi Era: Time to Remember and Time for Change (PDF), archived from the original (PDF) on 2011-07-21
- Marion Harding Biography, archived from the original on 2008-11-22
- Biography Center, archived from the original on November 11, 2007
