= Scratch hardness =

Any measure of hardness based on scratch resistance

Scratch hardness refers to the hardness of a material in terms of resistance to scratches and abrasion by a harder material forcefully drawn over its surface. Scratch hardness test or scratch test refers to any of a number of methods of measuring scratch hardness. Resistance to abrasion is less affected by surface variations than indentation methods. Scratch hardness is measured with a sclerometer.

Attempting to scratch a surface to test a material is a very old technique. The first scientific attempt to quantify materials by scratch tests was by mineralogist Friedrich Mohs in 1812 (see Mohs scale). The Mohs scale is based on relative scratch hardness of different materials; with talc assigned a value of 1 and diamond assigned a value of 10. Mohs's scale had two limitations: it was not linear, and most modern abrasives fall between 9 and 10.; so, later scientists attempted to increase resolution at the harder end of the scale.

Raymond R. Ridgway, a research engineer at the Norton Company, modified the Mohs scale by giving garnet a hardness of 10 and diamond a hardness of 15. Charles E. Wooddell, working at the Carborundum Company, extended the scale further by using resistance to abrasion, and extrapolating the scale based on 7 for quartz and 9 for corundum, resulting in a value of 42.4 for South American brown diamond bort.

There is a linear relationship between cohesive energy density (lattice energy per volume) and Wooddell wear resistance, occurring between corundum (H=9) and diamond (H=42.5).

== See also ==
- Scratch test (disambiguation)
