= Arthur Pan =

Hungarian artist

Arthur Pan. Winston Churchill, 1943. Oil on canvas, 40 x 50" (101.6 x 127 cm).

Professor Arthur Pan (18 December 1894 – 1983) was a Hungarian artist and portrait painter, whose subjects included Winston Churchill.

== Life and work ==
Arthur Pan was born in Timișoara, Austria-Hungary, and studied at the Budapest Academy of Art and in Paris at the Académie Julian. He came to England as a refugee from the Nazis.

He painted in England from 1920 to 1960 as a portraitist working primarily in oil. He painted portraits of historical personages, including Sir Winston Churchill. On 25 December 1943, The Illustrated London News carried a double page spread of "Mr Churchill—A Characteristic Portrait of the Prime Minister from a Painting By Professor Arthur Pan".

A replica of a large Churchill portrait by Pan was bought for the White House. Pan also painted a "striking" portrait of South African Field Marshal Jan Smuts for Christ's College, Cambridge and Lord Catto,

Photo of Field Marshal Jan Smuts	Photo of Lieut. General Sir Miles Dempsey
Both men were amongst the portrait subjects painted by Arthur Pan.

On 7 April 1945, The Illustrated London News carried a full front page of a specially commissioned painting by Pan of Lieut. General Sir Miles Dempsey DSO MC, The Commander of the British Second Army and the first British Army commander to cross the River Rhine.

In its issue of 4 March 1959, The Motor magazine referred to Pan's portrait of the late Sir George Beharrell and mistakenly also described the artist as dead, for which it apologised in a subsequent issue.

Two portraits were commissioned by the artist's physician, Dr. Ernst Friedrich Blumberg. The paintings were of the physician's wife Marion Harding in 1962, which she has in her collection, and an earlier work of his father Dr. Jacob Moritz Blumberg, a surgeon and gynaecologist; the whereabouts of the latter is unknown. They were painted at the residence of the artist in Chorley Wood, Hertfordshire, England.

During the 1950s Pan lived for two years at the Baghdad Palace of King Faisal II of Iraq where he worked on a commission for the Iraqi Royal Family. The portraits were all destroyed in the coup d'état of July, 1958.

A head and shoulders portrait of Churchill by Pan was auctioned at Christie's Fine Art Auction House in 1981. Another portrait of Churchill by Pan, completed in 1943 during World War II, hangs in the American Embassy in London, England.

Pan made two copies of paintings by Willem van de Velde the Younger, The Shore at Sheveningen and Dutch Vessels Close Inshore at Low Tide, 13.5 x 18.5", both of which he signed. They came up for auction in the UK in 2001.

Pan had a son who became an architect.

== See also ==
- Royal Society of Portrait Painters

== Notes ==
- 9 artworks by or after Arthur Pan at the Art UK site. Retrieved 27 July 2012.
