= Boas' sign =

- Differential diagnosis: Acute cholecystitis, Stomach disease

Boas' or Boas's sign is hyperaesthesia (increased or altered sensitivity) below the right Hypochondrium or 12th rib region, which can be a symptom in acute cholecystitis (inflammation of the gallbladder). It is one of many signs a medical provider may look for during an abdominal examination.

Originally this sign referred to point tenderness in the region to the right of the 10th to 12th thoracic vertebrae. It is less than 7% sensitive.

Its namesake is Ismar Isidor Boas (1858–1938), a German physician and the first licensed GI specialist in his country.

Boas' sign can also indicate stomach and duodenal disease. When the transverse processes of thoracic vertebrae T10-T12 are pressed or effleuraged with the bottom of the hand, pain can appear at the left of spinous processes (in stomach's lesser curvature ulcer) or at the right (in pyloric or duodenal ulcer).
