= Obturator sign =

- The obturator internus and nearby muscles
- Differential diagnosis: (obturator internus muscle irritation) due to appendicitis

The obturator sign, also called Cope's obturator test, is an indicator of irritation to the obturator internus muscle.

The technique for detecting the obturator sign, called the obturator test, is carried out on each leg in succession. The patient lies on her/his back with the hip and knee both flexed at ninety degrees. The examiner holds the patient's ankle with one hand and knee with the other hand. The examiner internally rotates the hip by moving the patient's ankle away from the patient's body while allowing the knee to move only inward. This is flexion and internal rotation of the hip.

In the clinical context, it is performed when acute appendicitis is suspected. In this condition, the appendix becomes inflamed and enlarged. The appendix may come into physical contact with the obturator internus muscle, which will be stretched when this maneuver is performed on the right leg. This causes pain and is evidence in support of an inflamed appendix.

The principles of the obturator sign in the diagnosis of appendicitis are similar to that of the psoas sign. The appendix is commonly located in the retrocecal or pelvic region. The obturator sign indicates the presence of an inflamed pelvic appendix.

Evidence shows that the obturator test does not adequately diagnose appendicitis, but can be used in conjunction with other signs and symptoms to make a diagnosis.

It was introduced by Zachary Cope (1881–1974), an English surgeon.

== See also ==
- Markle's sign
- Psoas sign
- Rovsing's sign
- McBurney's point
