= Psoas sign =

Medical sign

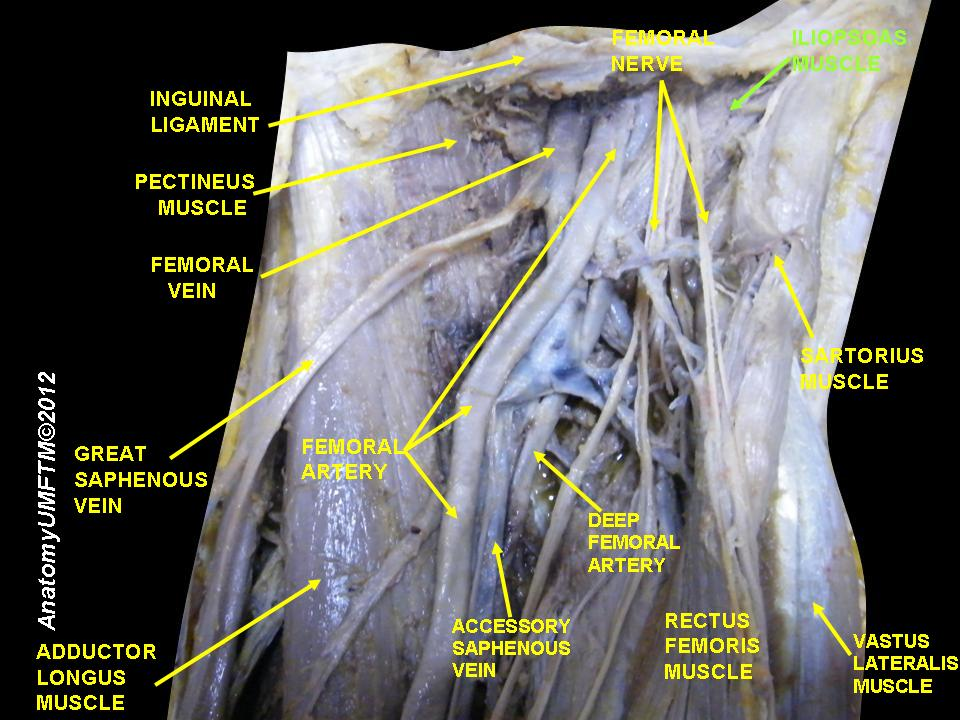
- Iliopsoas muscle and its other muscles
- Diagnostic method: Flexing the right leg, etc.
- Differential diagnosis: appendicitis, gastrointestinal hemorrhage

The psoas sign, also known as Cope's sign (or Cope's psoas test) or Obraztsova's sign, is a medical sign that indicates irritation to the iliopsoas group of hip flexors in the abdomen, and consequently indicates that the inflamed appendix is retrocaecal in orientation (as the iliopsoas muscle is retroperitoneal).

There are two techniques for detecting the psoas sign. One method is to have the patient lie in the supine position and lift their leg straight up while the physician places pressure on the patient's thigh. The second method is carried out by having the patient lie on his/her left side with the knees extended. The examiner holds the patient's right thigh and passively extends the hip. Alternatively, the patient lies on their back, and the examiner asks the patient to actively flex the right hip against the examiner's hand.

If abdominal pain results, it is a "positive psoas sign". The pain results because the psoas borders the peritoneal cavity, so stretching (by hyperextension at the hip) or contraction (by flexion of the hip) of the muscles causes friction against nearby inflamed tissues. In particular, the right iliopsoas muscle lies under the appendix when the patient is supine, so a positive psoas sign on the right may suggest appendicitis. A positive psoas sign may also be present in a patient with a psoas abscess. It may also be positive with other sources of retroperitoneal irritation, e.g. as caused by hemorrhage of an iliac vessel.

It was introduced by Zachary Cope (1881–1974), an English surgeon.

== See also ==
- Blumberg's sign
- Hamburger sign
- Obturator sign
- Rovsing's sign
- McBurney's point
