= Charles Dettie Aaron =

American gastroenterologist (1866–1951)

Charles Dettie Aaron (8 May – 1951) was an American gastroenterologist from Detroit. He is most well known for the discovery of Aaron's sign, an indicator of appendicitis.

== Bibliography ==
- Aaron, Charles Dettie. Diseases Of The Digestive Organs, first published 1915
