= Fothergill's sign =

- Differential diagnosis: Rectus sheath hematoma

Fothergill's sign is a medical sign for rectus sheath hematoma. It is positive when a mass in the rectus sheath does not move and can be felt during both flexion and relaxation of the rectus abdominis muscle. The mass may resonate (make an audible tone) on percussion (tapping) and usually does not cross the midline. The sign can help distinguish pain or hematoma in the abdominal wall, of which the rectus abdominis muscle and its sheath are a part, from pain inside the abdomen. This sign is especially useful in rural medicine. (Note: The second page of the article can be found at:)

It is named for English obstetrician William Edward Fothergill, who described features of rectus sheath hematomas in a 1926 article in the British Medical Journal entitled "Haematoma in the abdominal wall simulating pelvic new growth".
