= Aaron's sign =

Referred pain in the epigastrium indicative of appendicitis

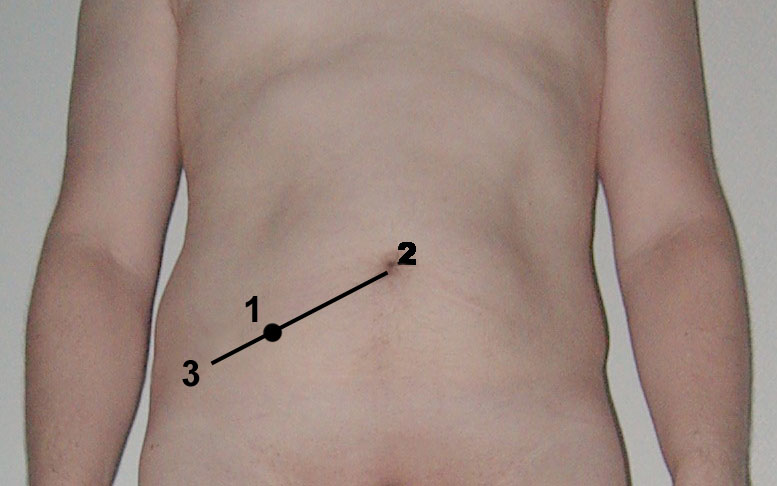
- Location of McBurney's point (1), located two thirds the distance from the umbilicus (2) to the right anterior superior iliac spine (3)
- Differential diagnosis: Appendicitis

Aaron's sign is a referred pain felt in the epigastrium upon continuous firm pressure over McBurney's point. It is a non-specific sign of appendicitis. While the sign is well known, and taught in medical education, its efficacy has not been well established.

Aaron's sign is named for Charles Dettie Aaron, an American gastroenterologist.
