= Niels Thorkild Rovsing =

Danish surgeon

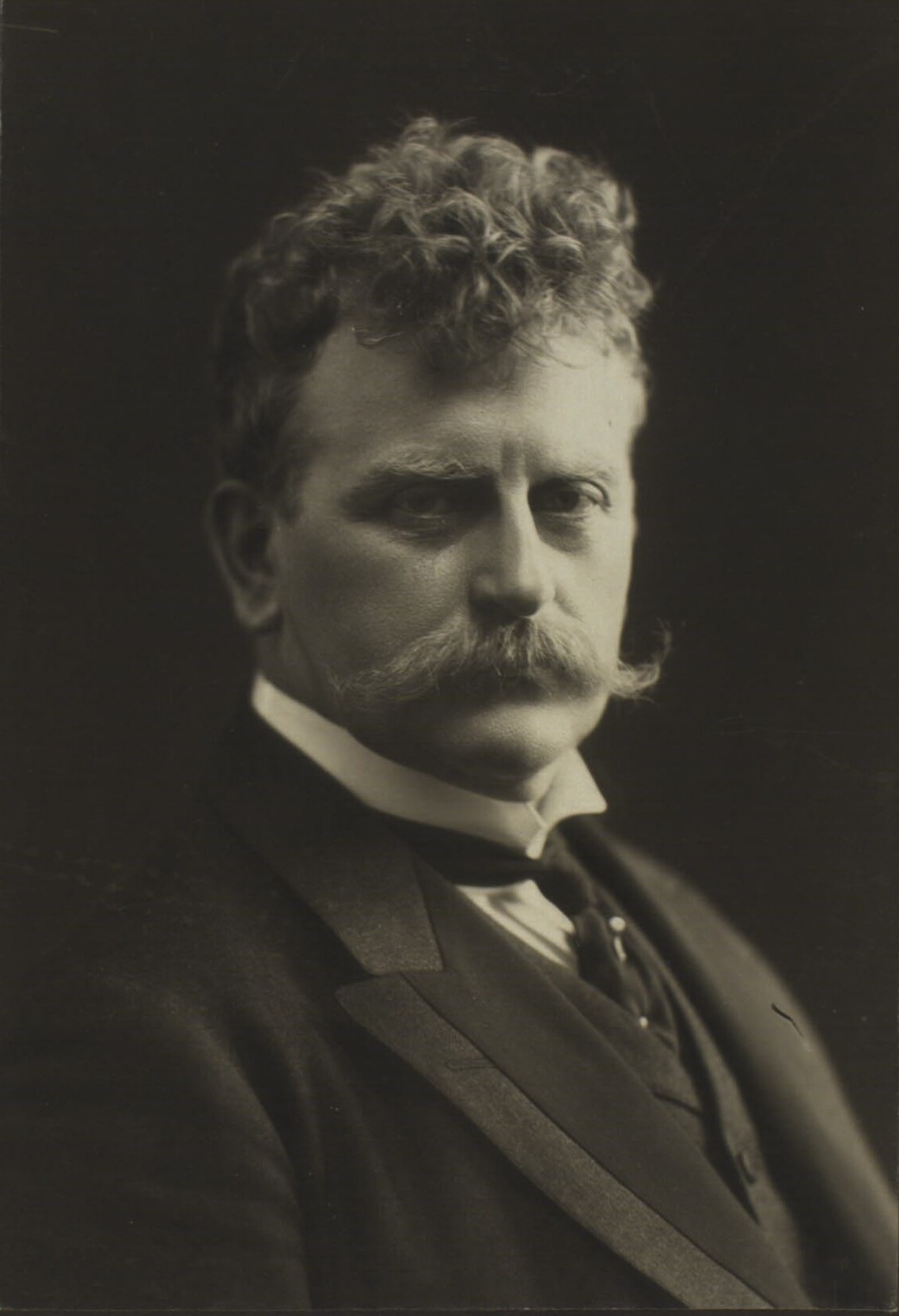
Niels Thorkild Rovsing

Niels Thorkild Rovsing (26 April 1862 – 14 January 1927) was a Danish surgeon remembered for describing Rovsing's sign.

== Early life and education ==
Rovsing was born in Flensburg, the son of first lieutenant and later captain M. Rovsing (1825–94) and Anna C. Crone (1830–82).

== Career ==
Niels Thorkild Rovsing had qualified in medicine by the age of 23. He became professor of operative surgery in 1899 at the University of Copenhagen. Because this post did not allow him hospital bed privileges, Rovsing opened a private surgical nursing home. It was enlarged and equipped with X-ray facilities a few years later. In 1904, at the age of 42, he became senior surgeon at the Frederiks Hospital. In 1905, his campaign for better surgical accommodation in Copenhagen resulted in the start of construction of the Rigshospitalet, which opened in 1910.

== Legacy ==
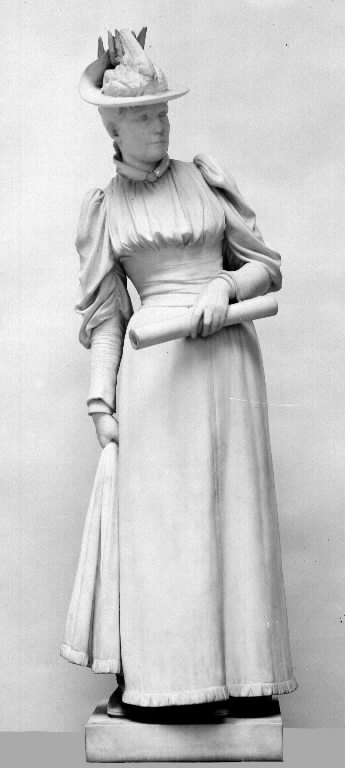
Vilhelm Bissen: A Lady. Emilie Marie Rovsing, née Raaschou, 1891

Rovsing's work covered abdominal pathologies, including cystitis, tuberculosis of the urinary tract, gallstone disease and appendicitis. He published about 200 papers and earned an international reputation. His writings on abdominal surgery were translated into German and English. He was an honorary member of the Edinburgh Medico-Chirurgical Society and of the Association of Surgeons of Great Britain and Ireland. He founded the Danish Surgical Society with Eilert A. Tscherning in 1908.

== Personal life ==
Rovsing married Marie Emilie Raaschou (23 March 1864 - 17 December 1930), a daughter of wine merchant Hans Georg Raaschou (1827–1901) and Villumine Caroline Andrea Nielsen (1838–1916), on 30 April 1890 in the Church of Our Lady in Copenhagen.

Rovsing was forced to retire in 1926 due to heart disease, and developed laryngeal cancer. For this he underwent surgery but did not tolerate radiotherapy well and died in Copenhagen in early 1927.
