= Rosenstein's sign =

- Differential diagnosis: acute appendicitis

Rosenstein's sign, also known as Sitkovskiy sign, is a sign of acute appendicitis.

It is observed when tenderness in the right lower quadrant increases when the patient moves from the supine position to a recumbent posture on the left side.

== Etymology ==
The sign is named after the almost forgotten Jewish German physician and director of The Jewish Hospital, Berlin, Paul Rosenstein (1875–1964). Sitkovskiy's symptom is the equivalent symptom.
