= Tenderness (medicine) =

Clinical sign

In medicine, tenderness is pain or discomfort when an affected area is touched. It should not be confused with pain a person feels without physical contact. Pain is a person's perception, while tenderness is a sign elicited by a clinician.

== See also ==
- Rebound tenderness, an indication of peritonitis.
