= Abdominal guarding =

Tensing of abdominal wall muscles to guard inflamed organs

Abdominal guarding is the tensing of the abdominal wall muscles to guard inflamed organs within the abdomen from the pain of pressure upon them. The tensing is detected when the abdominal wall is pressed. Abdominal guarding is also known as 'défense musculaire'.

Guarding is a characteristic finding in the physical examination for an abruptly painful abdomen (an acute abdomen) with inflammation of the inner abdominal (peritoneal) surface due, for example, to appendicitis or diverticulitis. The tensed muscles of the abdominal wall automatically go into spasm to keep the tender underlying tissues from being disturbed.

== Diagnosis ==
=== Differential diagnosis ===
- Abdominal aortic aneurysm
- Appendicitis
- Blunt force trauma to the abdomen
- Bowel obstruction
- Diverticulitis
- Dyspepsia
- Ectopic pregnancy
- GERD
- Ileus
- Inflammatory bowel disease
- Intussusception
- Mesenteric ischemia
- Nephrolithiasis
- Ovarian cyst
- Pancreatitis
- Pelvic inflammatory disease
- Perforated peptic ulcer disease
- Pneumonia
- Spontaneous bacterial peritonitis (SBP)
- Urinary tract infection/pyelonephritis
- Volvulus
- Zoster
  - Skin lesions may not be visible until another day or two
- Abdominal migraine
- Abdominal wall strain/injury
- Abscess (e.g. iliopsoas)
- Hepatic or splenic contusion/laceration
- Incarcerated hernia
- Insect toxins (e.g. black widow spider)
- Malingering
- Pneumoperitoneum secondary to abdominal trauma
- Septic miscarriage (See Miscarriage)

=== Laboratory findings ===
- Complete blood count (CBC)
- Blood urea nitrogen (BUN)/creatinine
- Liver function tests (LFTs)
- Glucose
- Amylase/lipase
- Urine culture
- Urinalysis
- Beta-human chorionic gonadotropin (beta-hCG)
- Cervical cultures are recommended to diagnose pelvic inflammatory disease

==== Electrolyte and biomarker studies ====
- Electrolytes

=== MRI and CT ===
- CT diagnoses:
  - Organ contusion
  - Organ laceration
  - Aneurysm
  - Diverticulitis
  - Appendicitis

=== Echocardiography or ultrasound ===
- Pelvic, abdominal and/or transvaginal ultrasound diagnoses:
  - Peritonitis
  - Ectopic pregnancy
  - Ovarian cysts
  - Fluid/blood secondary to trauma
  - Appendicitis
  - Aneurysm

=== Other imaging findings ===
- KUB x-ray imaging (kidney, ureter, bladder) could reveal nephrolithiasis and bowel gas pattern

=== Other diagnostic studies ===
- Symptomatic relief may be provided by paracentesis, which may also diagnose spontaneous bacterial peritonitis (SBP)
- Gastrointestinal endoscopy may be used or patients with suspected peptic ulcer disease
  - Helicobacter pylori testing may also be used
- Trial medications may be beneficial for the diagnosis and treatment of:
  - GERD/dyspepsia: Proton pump inhibitors or H2 blockers
  - Abdominal wall strain: Nonsteriodal anti-inflammatory drugs (NSAIDs)
  - Anxiety: Lorazepam
  - Zoster: Acyclovir

== Treatment ==
- Specific conditions need direct treatment
- Hemodynamic status and life-threatening disease require immediate attention
  - Volume replacement with a possible blood transfusion, and with normal saline
- For obstruction and persistent vomiting, place nasogastric (NG) tube

=== Pharmacotherapy ===
- If perforated viscus or intra-abdominal infection suspected, administer broad-spectrum empiric antibiotics

== Surgery and device-based therapy ==
- Early sepsis, or evidence of hemorrhage may require surgery (likely to be life-threatening emergency)
