= Smell as evidence of disease =

Methods of identifying disease from body odor

Smell as evidence of disease has been long used, dating back to Hippocrates around 400 years BCE. It is still employed with a focus on volatile organic compounds (VOCs) found in body odor. VOCs are carbon-based molecular groups having a low molecular weight, secreted during cells' metabolic processes. Their profiles may be altered by diseases such as cancer, metabolic disorders, genetic disorders, infections, and among others. Abnormal changes in VOC composition can be identified through equipment such as gas chromatography-mass spectrometry(GC-MS), electronic nose (e-noses), and trained non-human olfaction.

== History ==
Physicians historically used odors as a diagnostic indicator to judge a patient's health. Hippocrates saw the breath of patients as a potential indicator in around 400 BCE. Galen, Avicenna, and other physicians considered urine scent alongside color, density, sediments, and more in urinalysis. Urine with a sweet odor was diagnosed as possessing dominating sanguine humor relative to the other three humors; pungent odor as an excessive amount of bile; and foul odor as the presence of ulcers in the urinary tract or development of putrefactive fever, a fever occurring in the humors.

VOCs are currently deemed as noninvasive diagnostic biomarkers with the potential for point-of-care (POC) testing and long-term monitoring.

== Volatile organic compounds (VOCs) ==
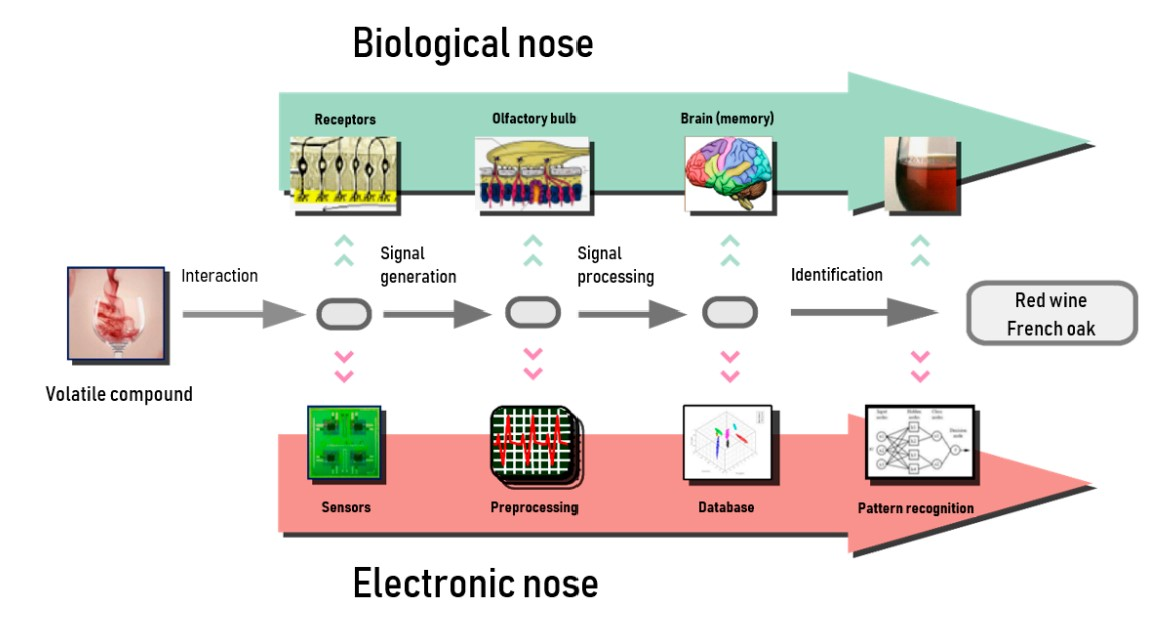
Schematics of electronic nose and biological olfactory system. Perception of smell is biologically constructed by the chemical stimulation of the olfactory receptor, generating electric signals that are preprocessed in the olfactory bulb and transmitted by the olfactory sensory neurons to the subsequent brain region. On the other hand, electronic noses have arrays of sensors interacting with VOCs, and a microcontroller conducts an analog-to-digital conversion as the preprocessing section. Data are then stored in the database of the pattern recognition machine, which can identify the aromas previously learned.

The biochemical mechanism of VOC generation in the human body is not fully comprehended. Their occurrence is due to changes in cell metabolism, inflammation, and oxidative stress, where reactive oxygen species (ROS) produced from cellular respiration interact with cellular structures (such as the membrane, proteins, DNA, and RNA) to create VOCs. The accumulation occurs in breath, skin, sweat, blood, urine, and faeces. The samples can be analyzed by various methods, such as selected-ion-flow-tube mass spectrometry (SIFT-MS), field asymmetric ion mobility spectrometry (FAIMS), nuclear magnetic resonance (NMR) spectroscopy, proton-transfer-reaction mass spectrometry (PTR-MS) and more, but the commonly used technologies are gas chromatography with mass spectrometry (GC-MS) and electric nose (e-nose). The difference in samples and methods of analysis chosen may explain the high heterogeneity observed in VOCs identified in different studies pertaining to the same diseases.

=== Electronic nose (e-noses) ===
Electronic nose (e-noses) is a standard method used for non-compound-specific identification where arrays of broadly tuned sensors capture patterns or fingerprints of VOCs to distinguish between healthy and diseased individuals. The limitation of this method is the inability to identify individual biomarkers, implying unique biomarkers for diseases can not be discovered.

=== Gas chromatography with mass spectrometry (GC-MS) ===
Gas chromatography with mass spectrometry (GC-MS) is considered the gold standard for VOC analysis to identify specific compounds. The chromatography separates the sample mixture in a gaseous state by forcing them through a column using a carrier gas, and the mass spectrometer identifies the compound. The limitation of this method is the requirement of expensive specialized equipment and highly trained personnel.

VOC analysis is seen in asthma, chronic obstructive pulmonary disease (COPD), cystic fibrosis (CF), chronic obstructive sleep apnea (OSA), inflammatory bowel disease, cancer, infections, and among others.

== Potential diagnostic applications ==
=== Cancer ===
Lung cancer-specific VOCs are 1-propanol, endogenous primary alcohol, and pentane. Pentane's presence in exhaled breath of patients has been hypothesized to originate from the increased peroxidation of fatty acids seen in severe lung disease. Foul-smelling p-cresol was solely found in colorectal and gastric cancer, expected to be caused by cancer's alteration of the microbiome. No singular compound could be exclusively considered a biomarker, but VOCs patterns observed may aid in distinguishing between certain diseases.

=== Metabolic disorder ===
People with diabetes were found to have an increased concentration of ketones, the cause of sweet urine smell, derived from the oxidation of non-esterified fatty acids. Exhaled acetone is often used as a biomarker, but its relevance as a sole biomarker for diabetes is ambiguous. Acetone is considered a biomarker in other diseases, such as lung cancer and cystic fibrosis (CF), and reports on acetone and blood glucose have been mixed.

Maple syrup urine disease, characterized by a strong maple syrup scent in urine, is found to have higher keto acid levels.

=== Infectious disease ===
The breath of patients infected with Aspergillus fumigatus, a fungus responsible for invasive aspergillosis, showed the presence of 2-pentylfuran, a compound not ordinarily produced in mammalian metabolism. VOC profiles may be confounded by intakes of peanuts, soy milk, and more, which also display 2-pentylfuran.

Patients with cystic fibrosis (CF) had a significantly higher level of ethane than individuals without CF, correlating with increased carbon monoxide levels and obstructed airways. For CF caused by P. aeruginosa infection, hydrogen cyanide, 2-aminoacetophenone, and methyl thiocyanate were identified as potential breath biomarkers.

== Non-human olfaction ==
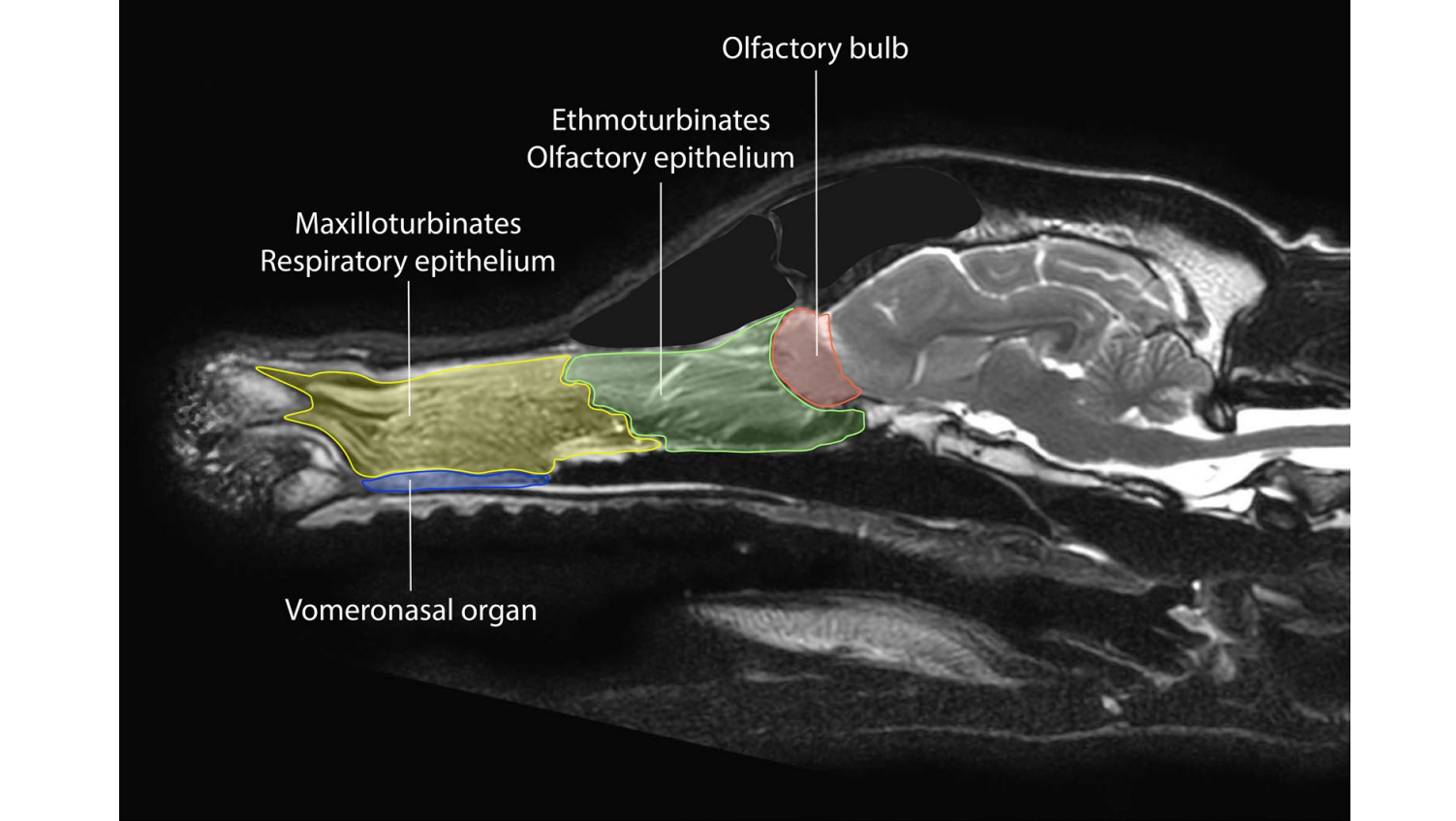
Sagittal magnetic resonance imaging highlighting the inner structures of the canine olfactory system

=== Dogs ===
Dogs have been used to diagnose symptomatic and asymptomatic individuals with metabolic and infectious diseases because of their highly sensitive olfaction due to a higher neuron packing density and threefold the number of functional genes encoding olfactory receptors relative to humans. This increase in receptors results in dogs possessing a 10,000 to 100,000 times higher accuracy in specially recognizing chemical messengers than humans. They have been frequently used to diagnose asymptomatic individuals with various infectious diseases such as SARS CoV-2, H1N1 Influenza, malaria, bovine virus infection, etc.

==== Cancer ====
The first study on trained dogs used for the detection of cancer was published by Willis et al. in 2004, observing that dogs were capable of detecting bladder cancer from urine samples. Subsequently, in 2004, Pickel et al. confirmed that dogs were able to successfully diagnose melanoma. In 2008, Horvath et al. confirmed dogs were successful in differentiating between cancerous and normal tissue and in distinguishing non-cancerous pathological tissue from cancerous tissue. Another study by Horvath et al. in 2010 found the dogs to show over 90% specificity in detecting ovarian cancer from blood samples, colorectal cancer from respiratory air, and prostate cancer from dog urine.

==== Clostridioides difficile diarrhea ====
The first study on dogs used for the detection of infectious diseases was conducted by Bomers et al. in 2012. The dogs were trained with food rewards to detect individuals with C. difficile diarrhea, and the results showed 100% specificity and sensitivity in the detection in stool samples. They were also capable of surveilling C. difficile in the environment with 92.3% sensitivity and 95.4% specificity for both odor detection and the ability to locate the source. Vancouver Canada hospital's canine scent recognition program also reported observing dogs' promising ability to detect C. difficile on hospital surfaces, equipment, and C. difficile reservoirs.

The advantage of using trained dogs to detect C. difficile compared to the traditional culture-based diagnostic method is the fast detection speed, which only takes a few minutes. Whether sniffing dogs could be universally employed for diagnosing C. difficile is dubious as although it yields the results faster than the preexisting nucleic amplification test, its responsiveness is significantly lower.

==== COVID-19 ====
Dogs have been trained to sniff SARS CoV-2-related VOCs since the outbreak of COVID-19 pandemic. Their overall success rates of detection were similar to or higher than reverse transcription polymerase chain reaction (RT-PCR) and antigen testing procedures. Grandjean et al. trained the dogs to sit in front of samples from COVID-19 positive patients. The success rate of distinguishing the sweat odor of individuals with COVID-19 from individuals without COVID-19 was between 83% and 100%. In principle, the dogs could be used to screen individuals with various stages of COVID-19 infections (including asymptotic, presymptomatic individuals with mild to severe symptoms) in different settings such as schools, transportation centers like airports, hospitals, and public gatherings. An advantage of using trained dogs compared to primates or cats to detect COVID-19 is that dogs are animal species with a low risk of binding between ACE2 receptor and SARS CoV-2, making them less likely to be transmitters. To further minimize the risk of transmission to dogs, sniffing sweat (which has low transmission property) is deemed the ideal mechanism for dogs to detect COVID-19. Other advantages of using dogs for screening COVID-19 over the current RT-PCR method are lower cost, decreased intrusiveness to the subjects, and no delay in reporting the results.

=== Rats ===
African giant pouched rats were trained to diagnose more than 14000 tuberculosis patients by smelling sputum. Compared to dogs capable of sniffing around 10 samples of C. difficile in stool or E.coli in urine per day, rats could sniff up to 100 samples in 20 minutes. Their success rates of detection were comparable to smear examination by microscopy after Ziehl-Neelsen staining with a responsiveness of 94% (which are common tools to diagnose tuberculosis in low-income countries). Their sensitivity was lower in comparison to nucleic acid amplification tests (80%) and with culture (60–70%). The rats were regarded as a good diagnostic tool for tuberculosis despite their lower responsiveness than nucleic acid tests when diagnostic settings are highly endemic countries with peripheral medical centers without proper laboratory set-ups.

=== Mosquitoes ===
Mosquitoes were found to be attracted to skin odors of individuals infected by malaria parasites (Plasmodium falciparum gametocytes). The attraction of uninfected mosquitoes was two to three times higher in children infected with gametocytes, and the attraction resumed to baseline following successful antimalarial treatments. Further investigation found a consistent effect of malaria on skin VOC profiles among populations with high malaria rates, where the infected showed a higher level of aldehydes heptanal, octanal, and nonanal, and notable distinguishable effects of asymptomatic and symptomatic infections.

== See also ==
- Electronic nose
- Anosmia
- Hyposmia
