= Ten Horn's sign =

Clinical sign

Ten Horn's sign is a clinical sign used for diagnosing appendicitis, particularly in older adults.

== Method ==
The patient lies on a couch. The examiner gently stretches the right spermatic cord using the thumb and index finger right about the testis in the right scrotum. For a patient with appendicitis, this causes pain in the right iliac fossa. The traction of spermatic cord is thought to cause right iliac fossa pain due to the apposition of the gonadal vessels against an inflamed appendix. The sensitivity and specificity of the Ten Horn's sign is unknown.

== History ==
This sign was proposed by Carel Hendrik Leo Herman ten Horn (1884–1964).
