= Liver scratch test =

Medical examination of the liver

The liver scratch test (also known as Lazar's test) is a technique used by medical professionals during a physical exam to locate the inferior border of the liver in order to approximate the size of a patient's liver. The technique was first credited to Burton-Opitz in 1925 where it was used to identify the cardiac silhouette, however there are references of similar techniques used prior to this. The liver scratch test can be used when other exam techniques used to approximate liver size are ineffective or unavailable and is thought to be most useful if the abdomen is distended, too tender for direct palpation, the abdominal muscles are too rigid, or the patient is obese.

== Technique ==
The liver scratch test is a type of auscultatory percussion that uses the difference in sound transmission between solid and hollow organs in the abdominal cavity in order to locate the inferior edge of the liver. The test is most commonly performed by placing the stethoscope below the xiphoid process and lightly scratching the skin parallel to the expected liver edge. The examiner begins scratching in the right lower quadrant of the abdomen along the midclavicular line and moves superiorly until the sound abruptly increases in volume. This location of suddenly increased auscultation volume is marked as the inferior edge of the liver and can then be used to determine the overall liver size. Multiple variations on the exam also exist including different stethoscope placements such as over the costal margin or liver, percussing the abdomen instead of scratching, or scratching in different patterns i.e. circular or lateral directions.

== Controversy ==
Despite being commonly taught to medical trainees, the liver scratch test's value as part of the abdominal physical exam has been controversial as it has historically performed poorly. While it has been proposed to abandon the test altogether, some studies have suggested that the scratch test is at least as accurate as percussion overall in identifying the liver edge and even more accurate for young trainees.
