= Rovsing's sign =

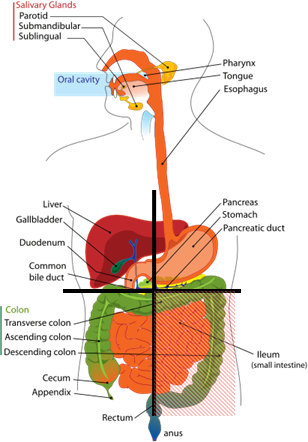
- Rovsing's sign is pain in the RLQ (near the appendix) experienced when the LLQ is palpated.
- Differential diagnosis: appendicitis

Rovsing's sign, named after the Danish surgeon Niels Thorkild Rovsing (1862–1927), is a sign of appendicitis. If palpation of the left lower quadrant of a person's abdomen increases the pain felt in the right lower quadrant, the patient is said to have a positive Rovsing's sign and may have appendicitis. The phenomenon was first described by Swedish surgeon Emil Samuel Perman (1856–1945) writing in the journal Hygiea in 1904.

In acute appendicitis, palpation in the left iliac fossa may produce pain in the right iliac fossa.

== Referral of pain ==
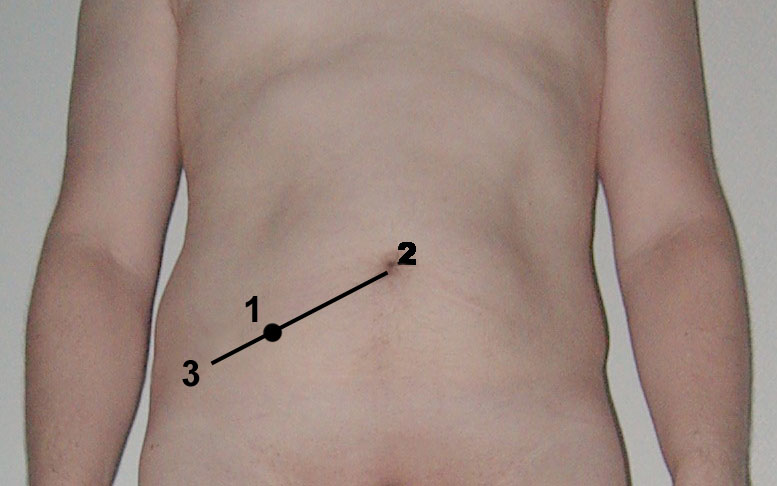
McBurney's point at #1

This anomaly occurs because the pain nerves deep in the intestines do not localize well to an exact spot on the abdominal wall, unlike pain nerves in muscles. Pain from a stomach ulcer or gallstone can be interpreted by the brain as pain from the stomach, liver, gall bladder, duodenum, or first part of the small intestine. It will "refer" pain often to the mid upper abdomen, the epigastrum.

Because the appendix is a piece of intestine, it follows a similar referral pattern. An appendix with some early inflammation may give a non-specific irritation somewhere near the umbilicus (belly button). Should the inflammation become severe, it may actually irritate the inner lining of the abdominal cavity called the peritoneum. This thin layer of tissue lies deep to the abdominal wall muscles. Now the pain has become "localized". If pressure is applied to the muscles of the right lower abdomen (or iliac fossa) near a very irritated appendix, then the muscle fibers in that area will be stretched and will hurt.

== Process ==
Pathologic explanation: This maneuver elicits tenderness in the right lower abdomen, because contents of the left lower abdomen are shifted upon application of pressure, further irritating the inflamed peritoneum.

A Rovsing's sign is elicited by pushing on the abdomen far away from the appendix in the left lower quadrant. The appendix, in a large majority of people, is located in the right lower quadrant. While this maneuver stretches the entire peritoneal lining, it only causes pain in any location where the peritoneum is irritating the muscle. In the case of appendicitis, the pain is felt in the right lower quadrant despite pressure being placed elsewhere.

Most practitioners push on the left lower quadrant to see where the patient complains of pain. If pain is felt in the right lower quadrant, then there may be an inflamed organ or piece of tissue in the right lower quadrant. The appendix is generally the prime suspect, although other pathology can also give a "positive" Rovsing's sign. If left lower quadrant pressure by the examiner leads only to left-sided pain or pain on both the left and right sides, then there may be some other pathologic etiology. This may include causes relating to the bladder, uterus, ascending (right) colon, fallopian tubes, ovaries, or other structures.

The eponym Rovsing sign is also used in patients with horseshoe kidney, consisting of abdominal pain, nausea, and vomiting with hyperextension of the spine.

While Rovsing's test is frequently performed in suspicion of appendicitis, its sensitivity and specificity have not been adequately evaluated, and is considered by some to be an antiquated examination test.

== See also ==
- Abdominal exam
- McBurney's point
- Psoas sign
- Obturator sign
