= Blumberg's sign =

Clinical sign indicative of peritonitis

Rebound tenderness
- ICD-10-PCS: R10.4
- ICD-9-CM: 789.6

Blumberg's sign (also referred to as rebound tenderness or Shchetkin–Blumberg's sign) is a clinical sign in which there is pain upon removal of pressure rather than application of pressure to the abdomen. (The latter is referred to simply as abdominal tenderness.) It is indicative of peritonitis. It was named after German surgeon Jacob Moritz Blumberg.

== Procedure ==
The abdominal wall is compressed slowly and then rapidly released. A positive sign is indicated by presence of pain upon removal of pressure on the abdominal wall.

== Clinical significance ==
The sign indicates aggravation of the parietal peritoneum by stretching or moving. Positive Blumberg's sign is indicative of peritonitis, which can occur in diseases like appendicitis, and may occur in ulcerative colitis with rebound tenderness in the right lower quadrant.

However, in recent years the value of rebound tenderness has been questioned, since it may not add any diagnostic value beyond the observation that the patient has severe tenderness. Use of the sign has been supported by others. A study published in 2022 found that a positive Blumberg's sign made the diagnosis of acute appendicitis more likely, but that a negative sign did not rule out the diagnosis. In that sense, a positive Blumberg's sign serves as a tool to supplement clinical diagnosis.

== See also ==
- Abdominal exam
- Murphy's sign
- Rovsing's sign
