= McBurney's point =

Point over the right side of the abdomen

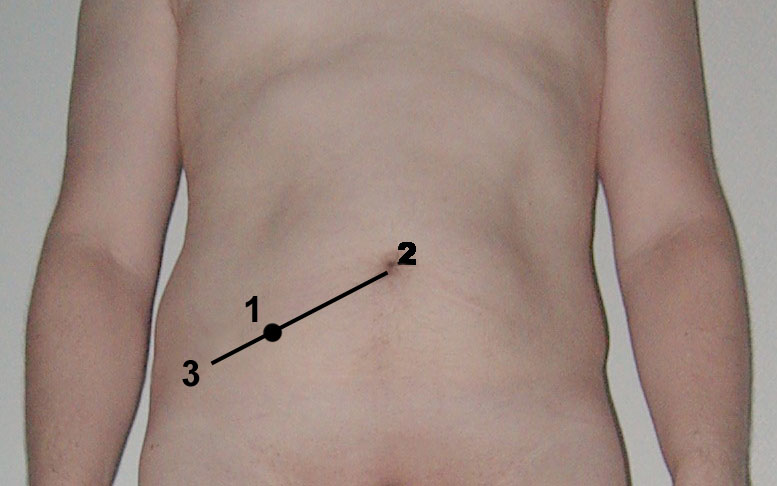
- Location of McBurney's point (1), located two thirds the distance from the umbilicus (2) to the right anterior superior iliac spine (3)

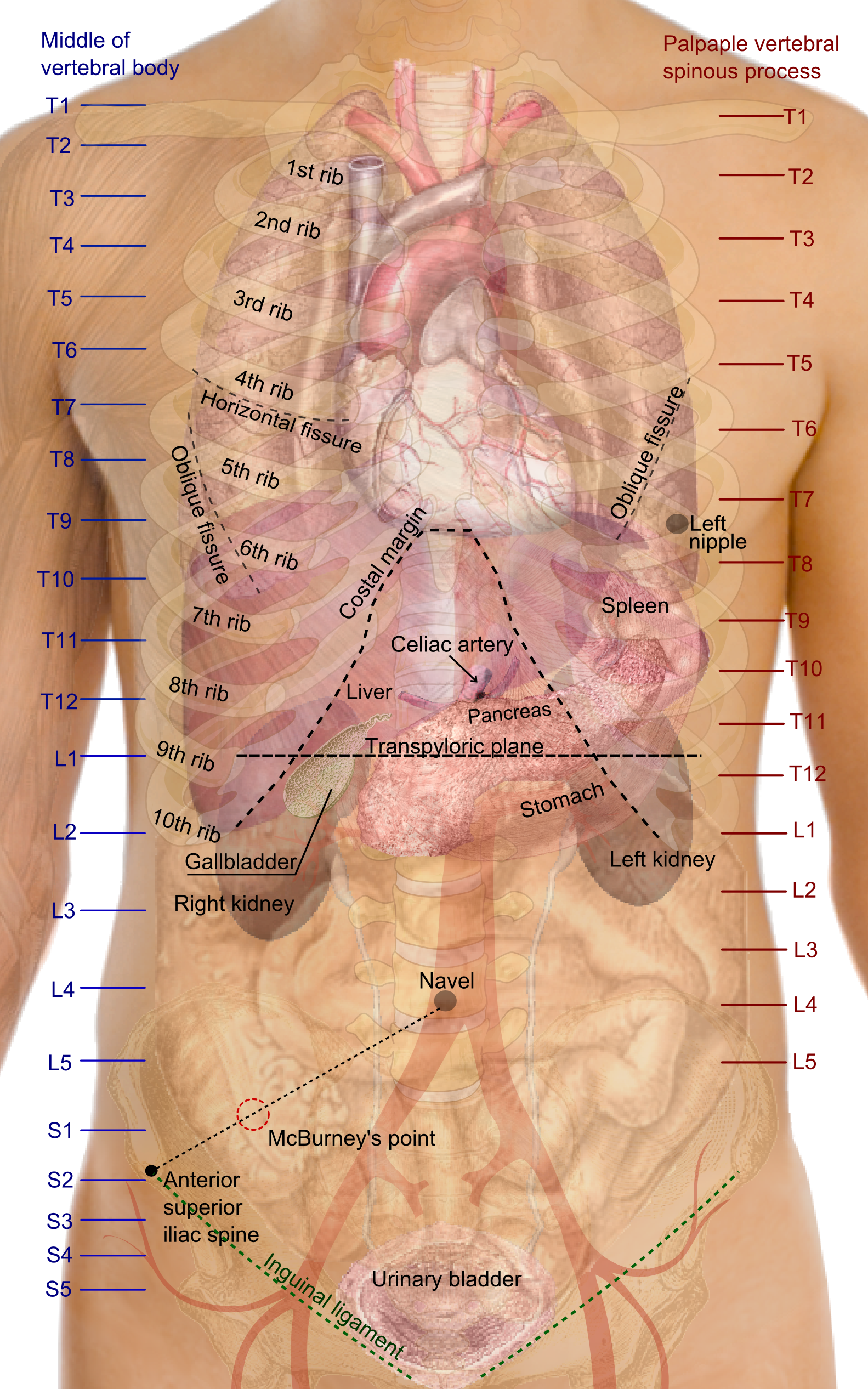
- Surface projections of the organs of the trunk, with McBurney's point labeled with a red circle at bottom left at the inferior part of the cecum

Identifiers
- FMA: 11362

McBurney's point is the point over the right side of the abdomen that is one-third of the distance from the anterior superior iliac spine to the umbilicus (navel). This is near the most common location of the appendix.

== Location ==
McBurney's point is located one third of the distance from the right anterior superior iliac spine to the umbilicus (navel). This point roughly corresponds to the most common location of the base of the appendix, where it is attached to the cecum.

Normal location of the appendix relative to other organs of the digestive system (anterior view). Cecum and appendix are visible at bottom left.

=== Appendicitis ===
Deep tenderness at McBurney's point, known as McBurney's sign, is a sign of acute appendicitis. The clinical sign of referred pain in the epigastrium when pressure is applied is also known as Aaron's sign. Specific localization of tenderness to McBurney's point indicates that inflammation is no longer limited to the lumen of the bowel (which localizes pain poorly), and is irritating the lining of the peritoneum at the place where the peritoneum comes into contact with the appendix.

Tenderness at McBurney's point suggests the evolution of acute appendicitis to a later stage, and thus, the increased likelihood of rupture. Other abdominal processes can also sometimes cause tenderness at McBurney's point. Thus, this sign is highly useful but neither necessary nor sufficient to make a diagnosis of acute appendicitis. The anatomical position of the appendix is highly variable (for example in retrocaecal appendix, an appendix behind the caecum), which also limits the use of this sign, as many cases of appendicitis do not cause point tenderness at McBurney's point. For most open appendectomies (as opposed to laparoscopic appendectomies), the incision is made at McBurney's point.

=== Pseudoaneurysm ===
A pseudoaneurysm in the aorta may be treated surgically, with an incision made between McBurney's point and the lower intercostal spaces.

=== Peritoneal dialysis ===
McBurney's point may be a useful site for insertion of a peritoneal dialysis catheter.

== History ==
McBurney's point is named after American surgeon Charles McBurney (1845–1913). McBurney himself did not locate his point in a precise way in his original article.

The seat of greatest pain, determined by the pressure of one finger, has been very exactly between an inch and a half and two inches from the anterior spinous process of the ilium on a straight line drawn from that process to the umbilicus

— Charles McBurney, "Experience with Early Operative Interference in Cases of Disease of the Vermiform Appendix"; New York Medical Journal, 1889, 50: 676–684 [pg 678].
