= Rudolph Valentino =

Italian actor (1895–1926)

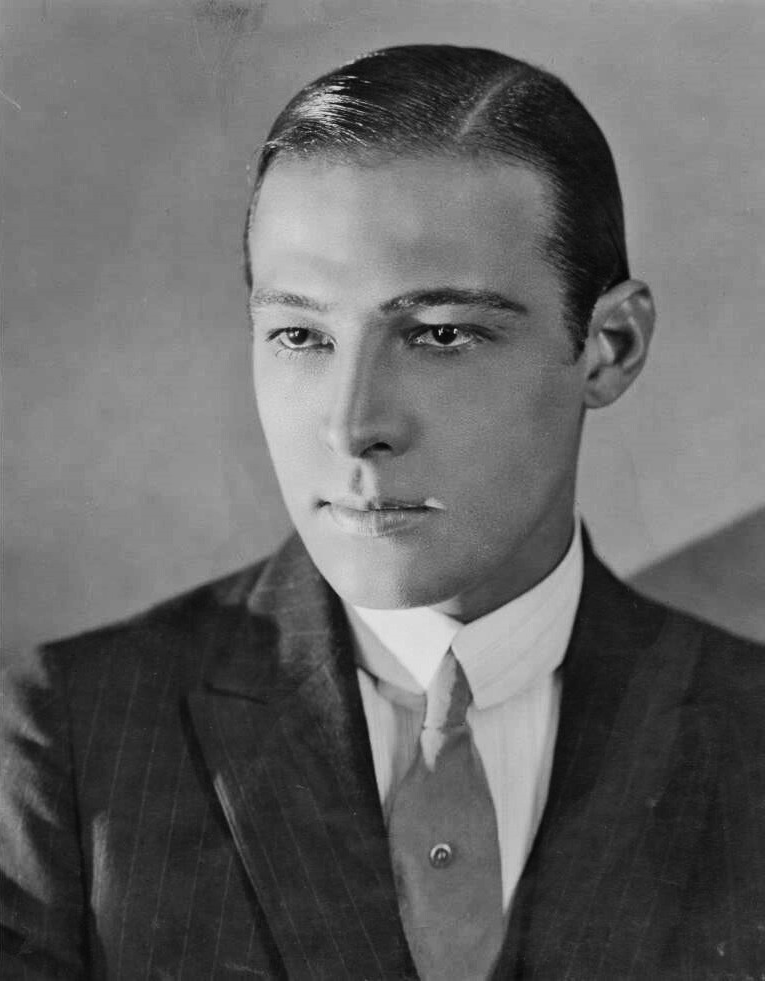
- Valentino in 1922
- Born: Rodolfo Pietro Filiberto Raffaello Guglielmi; May 6, 1895; Castellaneta, Italy
- Died: August 23, 1926 (aged 31); New York City, U.S.
- Burial place: Hollywood Forever Cemetery, Los Angeles, California, U.S.
- Other names: Rudolph Guglielmi; Rodolfo di Valentina; Rodolph Valentino
- Occupations: Actor; dancer
- Years active: 1914–1926
- Spouses: Jean Acker (m. 1919; div. 1922) Natacha Rambova (m. 1923; div. 1926)

Rodolfo Pietro Filiberto Raffaello Guglielmi di Valentina d'Antonguella (May 6, 1895 – August 23, 1926), known professionally as Rudolph Valentino or just as Valentino, was an Italian-born actor and dancer. Dubbed the Latin Lover, he became one of the most iconic stars of American silent cinema and an enduring symbol of old Hollywood glamour. Rising to international fame in the early 1920s, Valentino was celebrated for his exotic screen persona, romantic intensity, and expressive performances, which helped redefine male stardom during the silent era.

Often referred to as the first Latin Lover and the Great Lover, Valentino began his career as a taxi dancer, later moving into ballroom dancing, before he achieved breakthrough success with the film The Four Horsemen of the Apocalypse (1921), which popularized the Argentine tango dance with American audiences. He subsequently starred in several box-office hits such as The Sheik (1921), Blood and Sand (1922), The Eagle (1925), and The Son of the Sheik (1926). His on-screen image—sensual, passionate, and unconventional by the standards of the time—made him the first screen sex symbol, which provoked both fervent adoration and cultural backlash, making him a lightning rod in debates about masculinity, sexuality, and modernity in the 1920s.

Despite a career that lasted only a few years at its peak, Valentino's influence on popular culture was profound. In 1925, he established a film award recognizing artistic achievement, the Rudolph Valentino Medal, which was a precursor to the Academy Award. His sudden death in 1926 at the age of 31 from complications of peritonitis following surgery for appendicitis and gastric ulcers triggered mass public mourning, cementing his status as a legendary figure of early cinema.

Valentino's life has been depicted in several biographical films: Valentino (1951), The Legend of Valentino (1975), and Valentino (1977). From 1972 to 2006, his legacy was further commemorated through the annual Rudolph Valentino Award, presented in Italy in recognition of acting achievement.

== Early life ==
=== Childhood and education ===
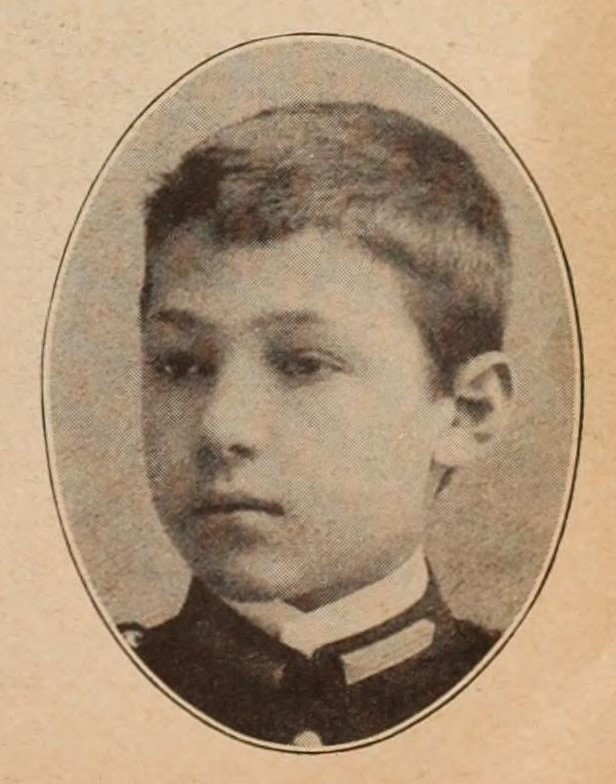
Valentino as a child, published in Photoplay, January 1923

Rudolph Valentino was born Rodolfo Pietro Filiberto Raffaele Guglielmi on May 6, 1895, in Castellaneta, Apulia, Italy. The additional names "di Valentina d'Antonguolla" do not appear in his birth or baptismal records; they derive from Valentino's own later accounts, in which they preceded his surname Guglielmi. He recalled that his mother told him: "The di Valentina is a papal title, and the d'Antonguolla indicates an obscure right to certain royal property which is entirely forgotten now because one of your ancestors fought a duel." That ancestor Guglielmi killed a member of the Colonna family in the duel and was forced to flee Rome for Martina Franca.

His father, Giovanni Antonio Giuseppe Fedele Guglielmi (1853–1906), was an Italian from Martina Franca, Apulia; he was a captain of cavalry in the Italian Army. He later established a veterinary practice in Castellaneta and conducted scientific research in bacteriology. He died of malaria when Valentino was 10. Valentino's mother, Marie Berthe Gabrielle Barbin (1856–1918), was French with Torinese ancestry (the original family name was Barbini, later gallicized to Barbin), born in Lure in the Franche-Comté region. Before marrying Gugliemi in 1889, she was the lady-in-waiting to Marchesa Giovinazzi, Principessa Ruffo di Calabria.

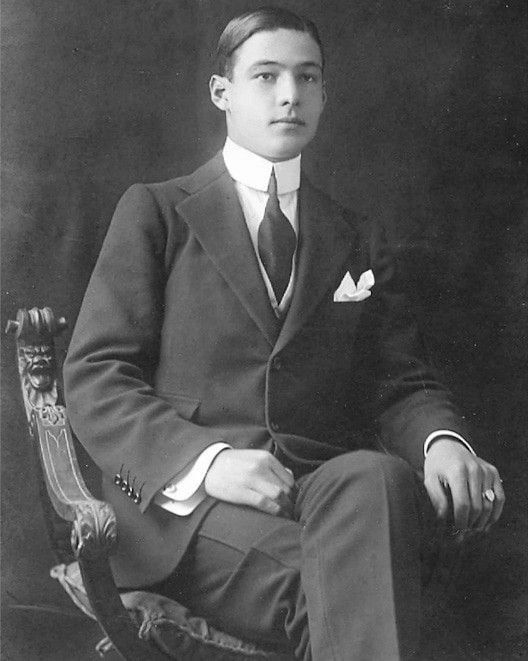
Valentino in Taranto before he departed for America, 1913

Valentino was the third of four children. The eldest, Beatrice "Bice" (1890–1891), died in infancy. He had an older brother, Alberto (1892–1981) and a younger sister, Maria (1897–1969). Growing up he was close to his sister and they would smoke corn silk behind the barn. Valentino was indulged for his striking looks and playful personality. His mother doted on him, while his father was more critical. Nicknamed "Mercury," after the wing-footed messenger god, he displayed a restless, theatrical temperament. He attended Dante Alighieri college, the equivalent to grammar school, in Taranto where he did so poorly that he had to repeat a grade and he joined the football team. His dark, rebellious streak—often described as gothic in tone—became a concern to his devout Catholic family, who sent him to a boarding school in Perugia.

Interested in becoming a cavalry officer, Valentino planned to enroll at the Royal Naval Academy. He spent a brief preparatory period in Venice, where he applied himself to his studies for the first time. He passed the written examination but failed the physical, as his chest measurement fell an inch short of the requirement. Deeply disappointed, he later earned a degree at the Agricultural Institute of Saint Ilario of Liguria in Nervi, in the province of Genoa, where he enjoyed his studies.

After graduating in 1912, at 17, Valentino left home for Paris and Monte Carlo, where he led a bohemian life—learning the then-controversial tango, socializing within fashionable circles, and quickly exhausting his savings. He soon returned to Italy and unable to secure employment, he moved to the United States for a fresh start in 1913.

=== Immigration to New York ===
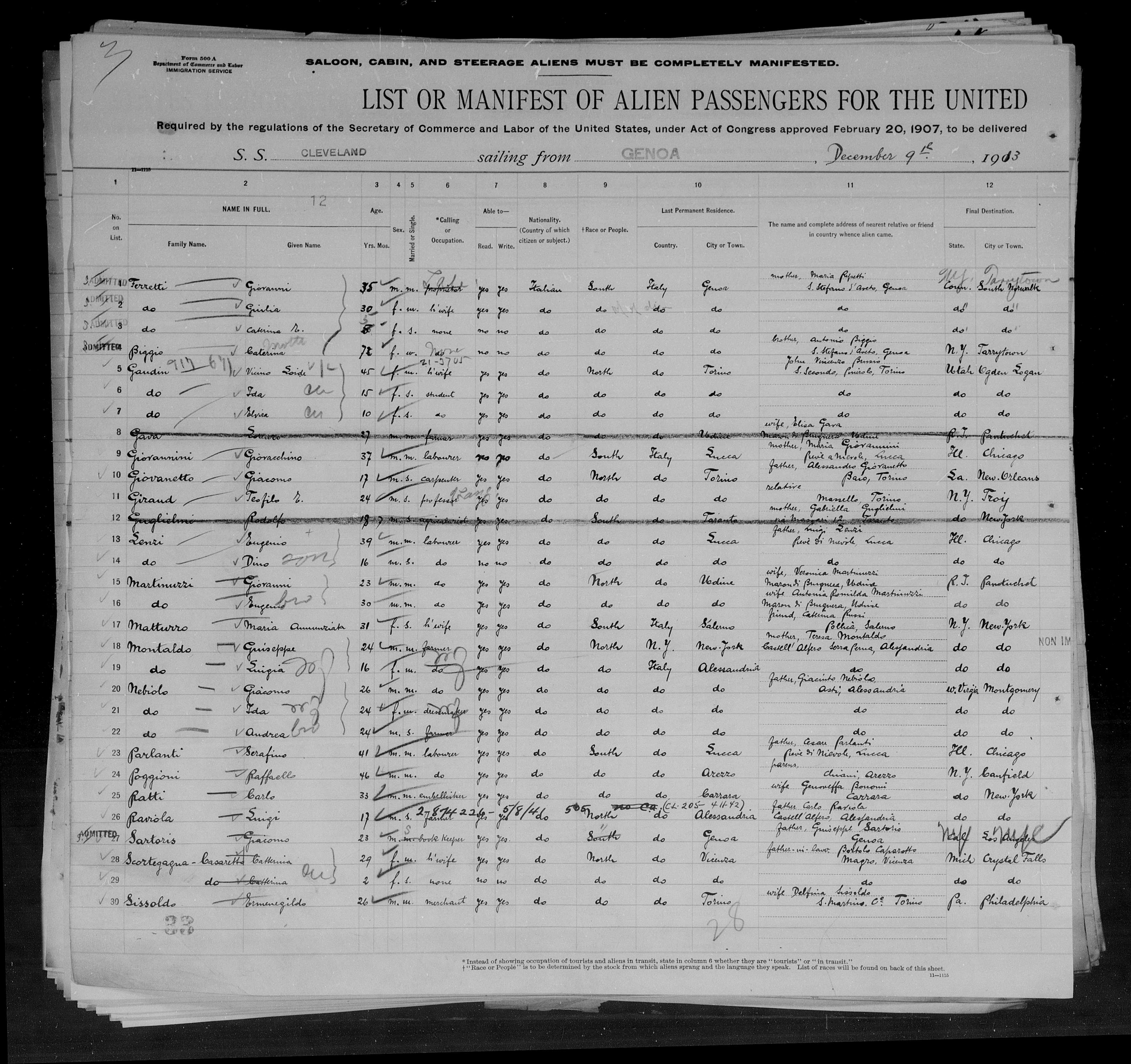
Line 12 of the manifest shows that on December 9, 1913, 18-year-old Valentino departed Genoa aboard the S.S. Cleveland.

On December 9, 1913, 18-year-old Valentino departed Genoa aboard the S.S. Cleveland for New York City, carrying a bank draft from Credito Italiano for the equivalent of $4,000 and calling cards embossed with a fictitious family crest. Unlike most immigrants of the period, Valentino traveled across the Atlantic as a first-class passenger. Although his mother initially purchased him a second-class ticket, he found the arrangement unsuitable and upgraded to first-class accommodations. There, he enjoyed superior services and amenities and believed the social environment would better position him to make useful connections in America. During the 14-day voyage he worked on his English, and proved a popular dance partner among the female passengers.

Valentino arrived in New York City on December 23, 1913. Contrary to popular belief, he did not undergo inspection at Ellis Island, as first-class passengers were typically processed aboard ship. He informed immigration authorities that he was an "agriculturalist" by profession and gave his middle name as "dei Marchesi," hoping to be taken for a descendant of a marquis.

After exchanging money at Brown Brothers on Wall Street, he explored Manhattan for the first time. An Italian acquaintance he had met during the voyage recommended Giolito's, a boardinghouse on West 49th Street where Italian was spoken and meals were available. Valentino rented a front-facing suite consisting of a bedroom, parlor, and bath. Seeking entertainment, he dined instead at Rector's on Broadway, a fashionable restaurant frequented by actors and society figures. Later that day, he returned to the S.S. Cleveland to retrieve his trunk, getting lost several times on the subway before finding his way back to Giolito's.

During the Christmas season, Valentino grew homesick and lonesome. Early in 1914, he reconnected with acquaintances he had known in Paris—Otto von Salm-Hoogstraeten and Alex von Salm-Hoogstraeten, and Georges (George T.) Aranyi—and spent evenings socializing and dancing. By spring, his finances were strained, and he recognized that he could no longer sustain his earlier lifestyle. He left Giolito's and moved to less expensive lodgings in uptown Manhattan.

In the spring of 1914, Valentino secured work on Long Island as an apprentice landscape gardener at Oak Hill, the Georgian Revival estate of Cornelius N. Bliss Jr. in Brookville, New York, he but disliked the work. More interested in the social world of Manhattan than in his duties, he neglected his responsibilities and was dismissed after damaging Bliss' motorcycle in an accident. Bliss subsequently provided Valentino with a small weekly allowance to tide him over in the short term and recommended him to the Central Park Commissioner as an apprentice landscape gardener. The position, however, was a civil service post that required a preliminary examination open only to American citizens.

Valentino subsequently had several menial jobs such as polishing brass, sweeping up stores or sidewalks, picking up debris, and washing cars. He pawned his belongings and moved into the Mills Hotel, where rooms cost 12 cents a night; when he could no longer afford even that, he slept on benches in Central Park and washed under fire hydrants.

=== Dancing career ===
Eventually, Valentino found work as a taxi dancer at Maxim's Restaurant-Cabaret. He soon advanced from what was colloquially known as a "lounge lizard" to an exhibition dancer, though he continued to frequent New York's nightclub circuit.

In December 1914, Valentino was introduced to exhibition ballroom dancer Bonnie Glass, who hired him as a replacement for her former partner Clifton Webb, paying him fifty dollars a week. Although he earned more as a taxi dancer, Valentino viewed the position as a strategic step up, as exhibition dancing offered greater visibility and prestige. Billed as her assistant "Monsieur Rudolph", Valentino first performed with Glass at Rector's and then her own Café Montmartre (formerly Café Boulevard), which she opened in January 1915. They became a popular duo and appeared at prestigious venues, including the Winter Garden Theatre, B. F. Keith's Colonial Theatre, and B. F. Keith's Palace Theatre in New York City, followed by engagements at the Garden Pier in Atlantic City and the New Brighton Theatre in Coney Island.

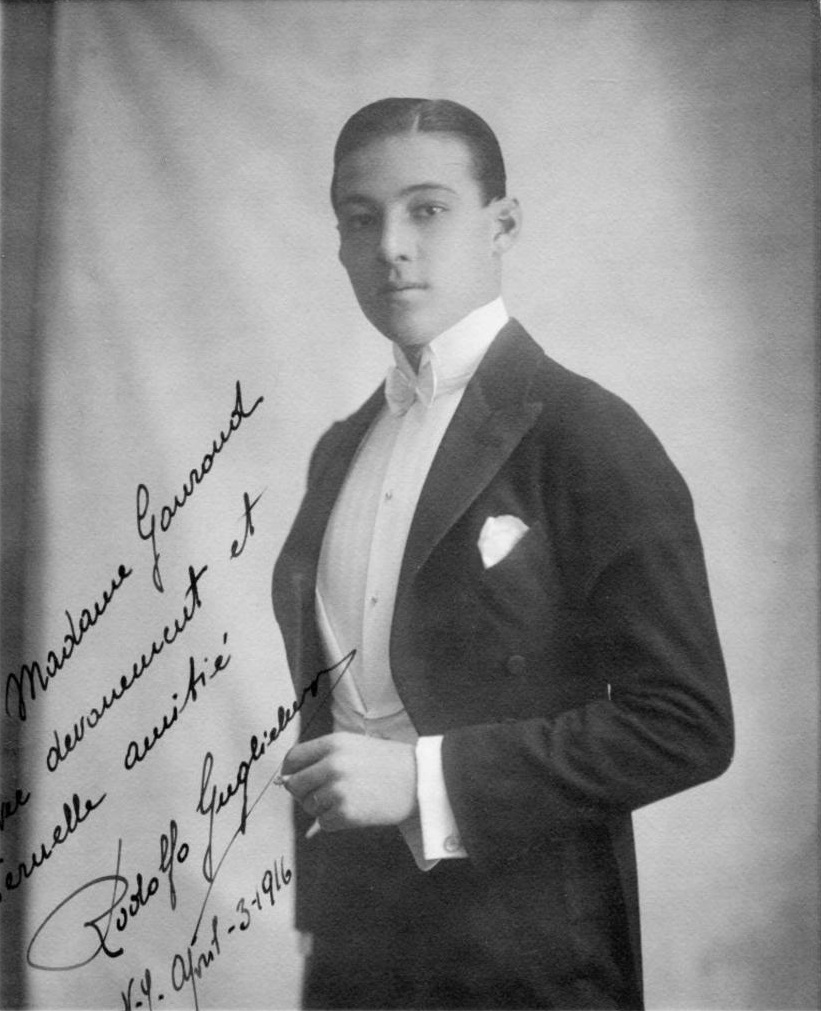
Valentino in a portrait inscribed to socialite Aimée Crocker Gouraud, 1916

The duo performed matinees at B. F. Keith's Orpheum in Brooklyn, and toured to B. F. Keith's theatres in Boston and Washington, D.C., as well as Shea's Theatre in Buffalo. They also participated in a Cake Walk contest at Jardin de Paris, a glass-enclosed rooftop theatre atop the New York Theatre, in New York City. Capitalizing on his European image, Valentino was billed as "Signor Rodolfo" for appearances with Glass at the Cabaret Mondain on West 45th Street and at her club Chez Fysher. By late 1915, advertisements listed "Bonnie Glass & Rudolph," under the management of Myron S. Bentham, a prominent theatrical agent of the period. He continued dancing with Glass into 1916, until her retirement following her marriage to artist Ben Ali Haggin.

After Glass retired, restaurateur Joe Pani hired Valentino to dance the tango with Joan Sawyer. Valentino and Sawyer toured major eastern cities on the B. F. Keith theatres circuit, and also performed at the Woodmansten Inn. They appeared before President Woodrow Wilson in Washington, D.C., an event Valentino later recalled with pride. By this period, he was earning $240 a week, a notable sum early in his career.

=== The de Saulles scandal ===
While dancing, Valentino met Chilean heiress Blanca de Saulles, who was unhappily married to businessman John "Jack" de Saulles. In July 1916, she filed for divorce and sought custody of their son, citing her husband's well-known infidelities. Whether Valentino and Blanca de Saulles were romantically involved remains unclear. However, during the divorce proceedings, Valentino testified in support of her claims, alleging that John de Saulles had maintained a long-term affair with Joan Sawyer. Following the divorce, John de Saulles reportedly used his political influence to retaliate.

On September 5, 1916, Valentino was arrested alongside Mrs. Georgia Thyme at her apartment where he rented a room at 909 Seventh Avenue near Carnegie Hall. He was accused of being a pimp and jailed at the House of Detention and charged with violations of the Mann Act in connection with a so-called "white slave" investigation involving the disappearance of three women. Thyme, a known madame, was detained on the same charge. Assistant District Attorney James E. Smith, who conducted the raid, said he was informed by a reliable source that wealthy "social climbers" were blackmailed after indiscreet visits to her home. District Attorney Swann told the press that Valentino admitted that he was a "bogus count or marquias". Swann described him as a "handsome fellow, about twenty years old, and wears corsets and a wrist watch. He was often seen dancing in well known hotels and tango parlors with Joan Sawyer and Bonnie Glass." The evidence was insufficient, and after a few days their bail was reduced from $10,000 to $1,500; the charges were soon dropped.

In August 1917, Blanca de Saulles fatally shot her former husband, John de Saulles, during a custody dispute over their son. In the aftermath of the highly publicized trial and ensuing scandal, Valentino found himself unable to secure work. Fearing he might be called as a witness in another sensational case, he left New York and joined a traveling musical troupe, which ultimately took him to the West Coast.

== Film career ==
=== Early career and supporting roles ===
While still working as a dancer in New York, Valentino appeared in a few uncredited film roles as an extra in 1916, including The Quest of Life, The Foolish Virgin and Seventeen.

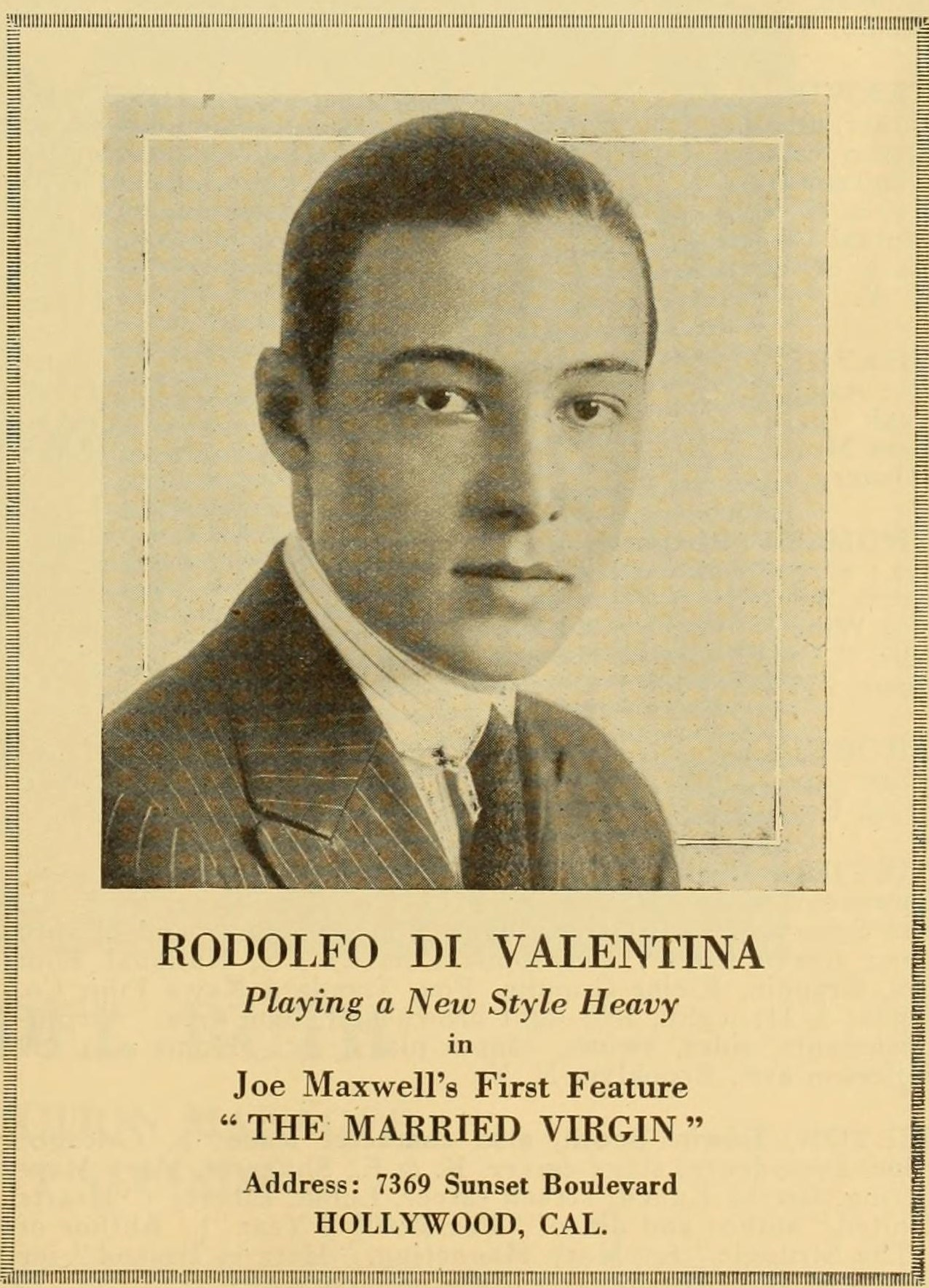
Valentino in an advertisement for The Married Virgin (1918)

In 1917, Valentino joined an operetta company that traveled to Utah, where it disbanded. He considered becoming a farmer in California, and then joined an Al Jolson production of Robinson Crusoe, Jr., which was traveling to Los Angeles. By fall, he was in San Francisco with a bit part in a theatrical production of Nobody Home. While in town, Valentino met actor Norman Kerry, who convinced him to try a career in motion pictures. Valentino and Kerry moved back to Los Angeles and became roommates at the Alexandria Hotel.

Although he was widely advertised as a dancer in New York, in Los Angeles his was virtually unknown. He taught dance and built up a following that included older female clientele who would let him borrow their luxury cars. At one point after the United States entered World War I, both Kerry and Valentino tried to get into the Canadian Air Force to fly and fight in France.

With his dancing success, Valentino found a room of his own on Sunset Boulevard and began actively seeking screen roles. Soon, director Emmett J. Flynn cast him as an extra in the film Alimony. Despite his best efforts, he was typically cast as a "heavy" (villain) or gangster. At the time, the archetypal major male star was Wallace Reid, with a fair complexion, light eyes, and an All-American look, with Valentino the opposite; he eventually supplanted Sessue Hayakawa as Hollywood's most popular "exotic" male lead.

His first substantial acting role followed in The Married Virgin, where he was cast in a stereotypical role as a calculating Italian count. During production, he reportedly remained in character by speaking Italian on set. For the first time, he was billed as Rodolfo di Valentina, a name intended to evoke both a papal title within his family lineage and Saint Valentine, the patron saint of lovers. The change reflected practical considerations as well: his birth surname, Guglielmi, was considered difficult for American audiences to pronounce, spell, or remember.

Early in his film career, D. W. Griffith assessed Valentino's potential but declined to cast him in major roles, advising him to lose weight and moderate what he described as an overly expressive acting style. Griffith passed on casting Valentino as the Mexican bandit in Scarlet Days, believing his "foreign" appearance would not appeal to audiences, but employed him instead as a dancer in the stage prologue to The Greatest Thing in Life at Clune's Auditorium.

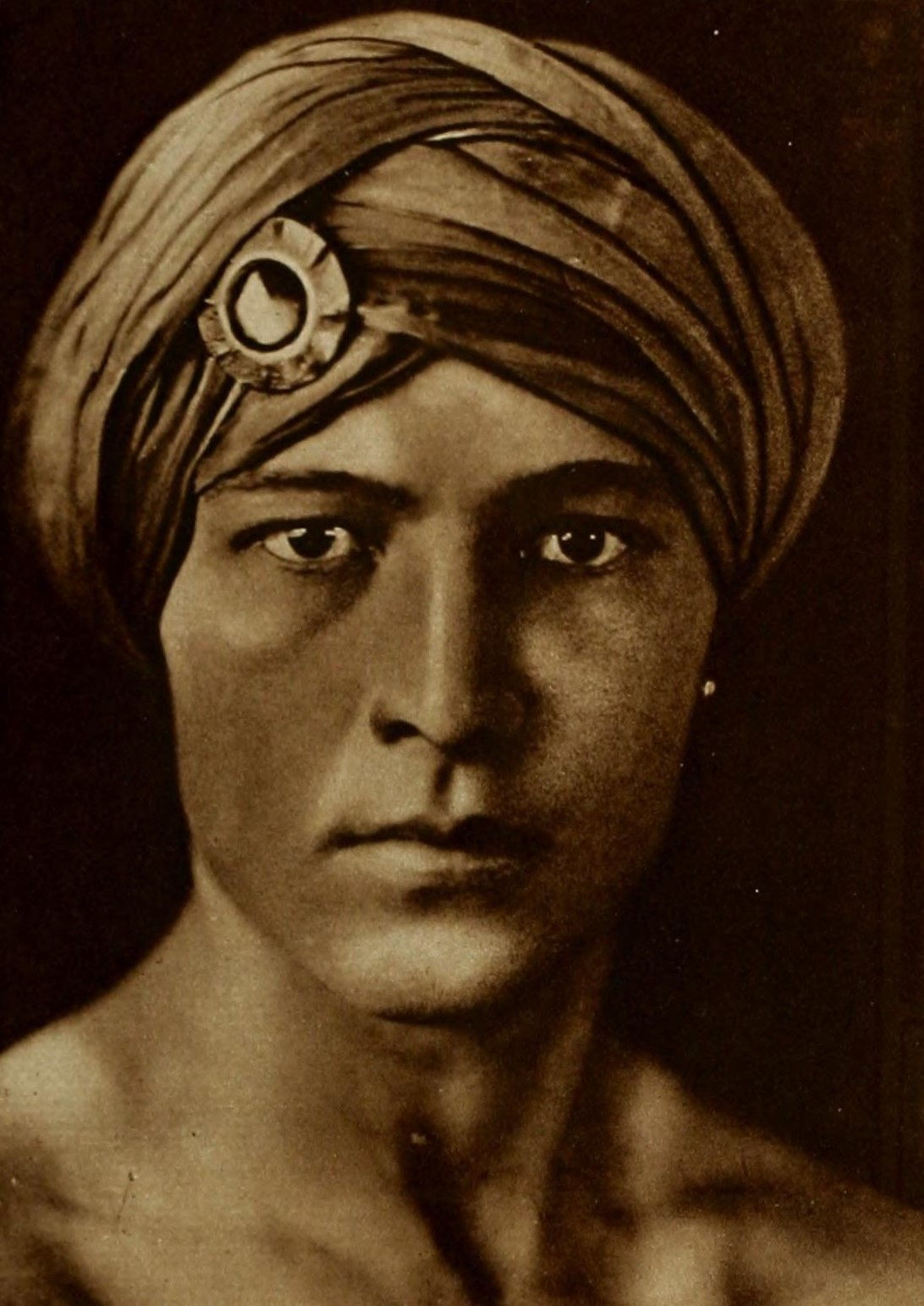
Valentino in Motion Picture Classic, November 1920

As Valentino's professional dancing engagements increased, his interest in dancing waned. In 1919, he applied for an acting position at Universal Studios, stating that he had entered motion pictures because he was "tired of ballroom dancing". "I was determined never to return to dancing. But I had to—at times—in order to earn a temporary livelihood. Not that I felt I was above the work. I sincerely admire such artists as Nijinsky and Mordkin. But I did not feel I had their talents, nor did I have any real ambition to follow their paths", he later recalled.

That year, he had bit parts in several films. It was a bit part as a "cabaret parasite" in the drama Eyes of Youth, starring Clara Kimball Young, that caught the attention of screenwriter June Mathis, who thought he would be perfect for her next movie. Young would later say it was she and Lewis J. Selznick who discovered him, and that they were disappointed when Valentino accepted a lucrative offer at Metro. He appeared as second lead in the film The Delicious Little Devil with actress Mae Murray. In November 1919, Valentino married actress Jean Acker.

=== Breakthrough and rise to stardom ===
Displeased with playing "heavies," Valentino briefly entertained the idea of returning to New York permanently. He returned for a visit in 1920, staying with friends in Greenwich Village, eventually settling in Bayside, Queens.

While traveling to Palm Springs, California, to film Stolen Moments, Valentino read the novel The Four Horsemen of the Apocalypse by Vicente Blasco Ibáñez. Seeking out a trade paper, he discovered that Metro had bought the film rights to the story. In New York, he sought out Metro's office, only to discover that June Mathis had been trying to find him. She cast him in the role of Julio Desnoyers. For the director, Mathis had chosen Rex Ingram, with whom Valentino did not get along, leading Mathis to play the role of peacekeeper between the two.

The Four Horsemen of the Apocalypse was released in 1921 and became a commercial and critical success. It was one of the first films to make $1,000,000 at the box office, the sixth-highest grossing silent film ever.

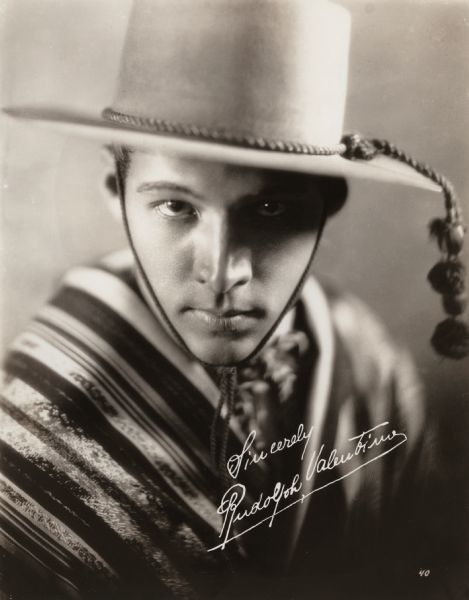
Publicity photo for The Four Horsemen of the Apocalypse (1921)

Metro Pictures seemed unwilling to acknowledge that it had made a star. Most likely due to Ingram's lack of faith in Valentino, the studio refused to give him a raise beyond the $350 a week he had made for Four Horsemen. For his follow-up film, they forced him into a bit part in a B-film called Uncharted Seas. While working on the Metro lot, Valentino was introduced by Russian actress Alla Nazimova to her art director, Natacha Rambova. Rambova subsequently joined Nazimova, June Mathis, Ivano, and Valentino in developing the Nazimova production Camille, in which Valentino was cast as Armand, the heroine's love interest. Largely shaped by the artistic control of Nazimova and Rambova, the film was regarded by critics and audiences as overly avant-garde.

During this period, Rambova assumed responsibility for managing Valentino's fan mail and publicity photographs. A series of images she took of Valentino dressed as a faun attracted considerable attention and were later cited during his divorce proceedings with his first wife, Jean Acker. Valentino testified that the photographs had been intended as preparatory material for a proposed screenplay titled The Faun Through the Ages.

Valentino's final film for Metro was the Mathis-penned The Conquering Power. The film received critical acclaim and did well at the box office. After the film's release, Valentino made a trip to New York, where he met with several French producers. Yearning for Europe, better pay, and more respect, Valentino returned and promptly quit Metro. He then took up with Famous Players–Lasky, forerunner of the present-day Paramount Pictures, a studio known for films that were more commercially focused. Mathis soon joined him, angering both Ivano and Rambova.

The Sheik (1921)

Jesse L. Lasky intended to capitalize on the star power of Valentino, and cast him in a role that solidified his reputation as the "Latin Lover." In The Sheik (1921), Valentino played the starring role of Sheik Ahmed Ben Hassan. The film was a major success and defined not only his career but his image and legacy. Valentino tried to distance the character from a stereotypical portrayal of an Arab man. Asked if Lady Diana (his love interest) would have fallen for a "savage" in real life, Valentino replied, "People are not savages because they have dark skins. The Arabian civilization is one of the oldest in the world … the Arabs are dignified and keen-brained."

=== Peak fame and major films ===
Famous Players produced four more feature-length films over the next 15 months. His leading role in Moran of the Lady Letty was of a typical Douglas Fairbanks nature; however, to capitalize on Valentino's bankability, his character was given a Spanish name and ancestry. The film received mixed reviews, but was still a hit with audiences.

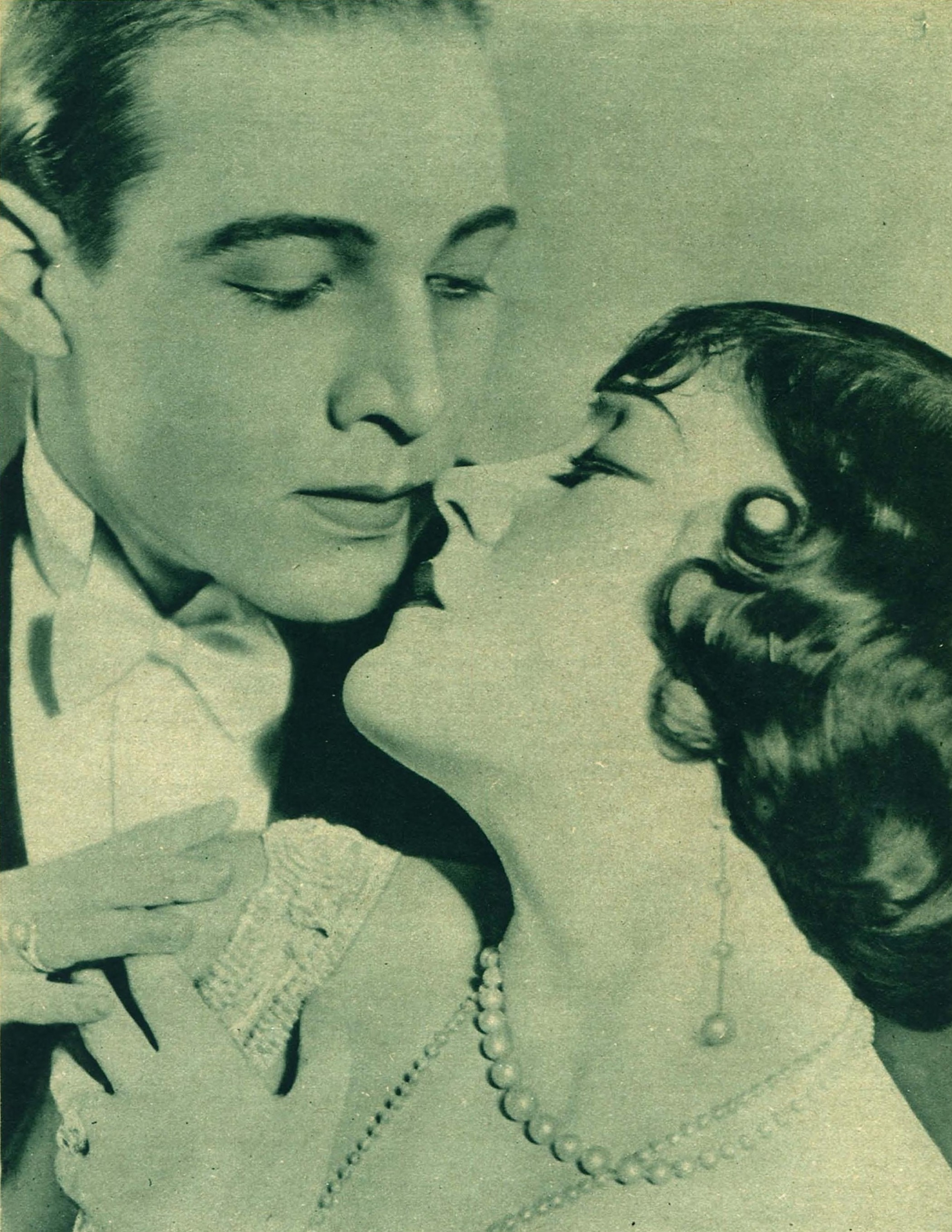
Film still of Valentino and Gloria Swanson for Beyond the Rocks (1922) in the July 1922 issue of Picture Play

In November 1921, Valentino filmed Beyond the Rocks alongside Gloria Swanson. Released in 1922, the film was noted for its lavish sets and extravagant costumes. Women's Wear Daily noted, "If beautiful clothes continue to be a feature of a screen star's attributes, then it does seem too bad that colors cannot register; if they could, the costuming would have been the best part of Elinor Glyn's latest release, 'Beyond the Rocks.'" For decades, Beyond the Rocks was considered a lost film, with only a one-minute fragment known to survive. In 2002, a complete print was discovered in the Netherlands by the Netherlands Film Museum. A restored version was subsequently released on DVD in 2006.

In February 1922 Life magazine reported that, according to the Famous Players press office, Valentino would henceforth be known as "Rodolph" rather than "Rudolph." He began work on another Mathis-penned film, Blood and Sand. He played the lead—bullfighter Juan Gallardo—and co-starred with Lila Lee and Nita Naldi. Initially believing the film would be shot in Spain, Valentino was upset to learn that the studio planned on shooting on a Hollywood back lot. He was further irritated by changes in production, including a director of whom he did not approve.

After finishing the film, Valentino married Rambova in May 1922, which led to a bigamy trial, as he had been divorced from his first wife, Jean Acker, for less than a full year, as required by California law at the time. The trial was a sensation and the pair was forced to have their marriage annulled and to be separated. Despite the trial, the film was still a success, with critics calling it a masterpiece on par with Broken Blossoms and Four Horsemen. Blood and Sand became one of the four top-grossing movies of 1922, breaking attendance records, and grossing $37,400 at the Rivoli Theatre alone. Valentino considered this one of his best films.

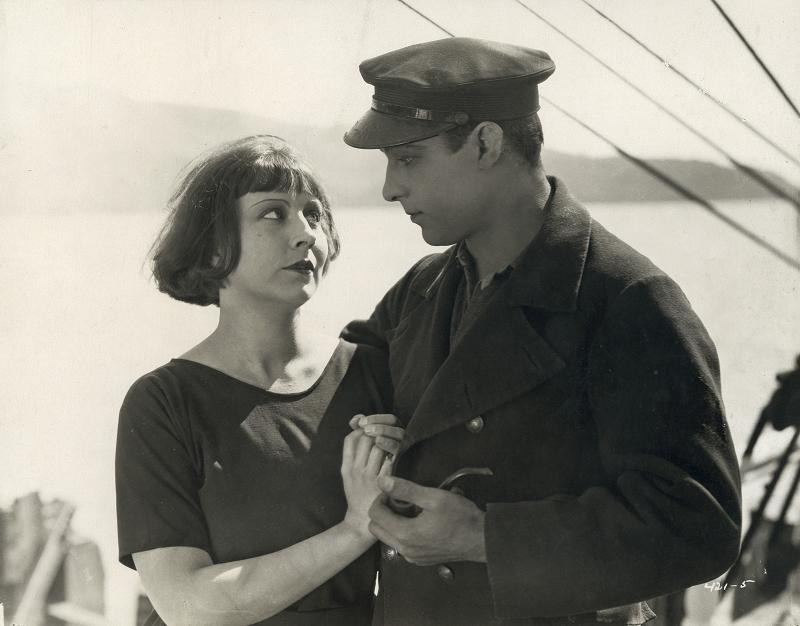
Film still of Valentino with Dorothy Dalton in Moran of the Lady Letty (1922)

During his forced break from Rambova, the pair began working separately on the Mathis-penned The Young Rajah. Only fragments of this film, recovered in 2005, still remain. The film did not live up to expectations and underperformed at the box office. Missing Rambova, Valentino returned to New York after the release of The Young Rajah. They were spotted and followed by reporters constantly. During this time, Valentino began to contemplate not returning to Famous Players, although Jesse Lasky already had his next picture, The Spanish Cavalier, in preparation. After speaking with Rambova and his lawyer Arthur Butler Graham, Valentino declared a 'one-man strike' against Famous Players.

=== Strike against Famous Players ===
Valentino refused to continue work for Famous Players–Lasky, objecting to the studio's practice of assigning stars to standardized, short-format films. In September 1922, he refused to accept paychecks from Famous Players–Lasky until the dispute was resolved, despite owing the studio money he had used to pay off debts incurred by his former wife, Jean Acker. Angered, Famous Players, in turn, filed suit against him. Valentino did not back down, and Famous Players realized how much they stood to lose. In trouble after shelving Roscoe Arbuckle pictures, the studio tried to settle by upping his salary. Variety erroneously announced the salary increase as a "new contract" before news of the lawsuit was released, and Valentino angrily rejected the offer.

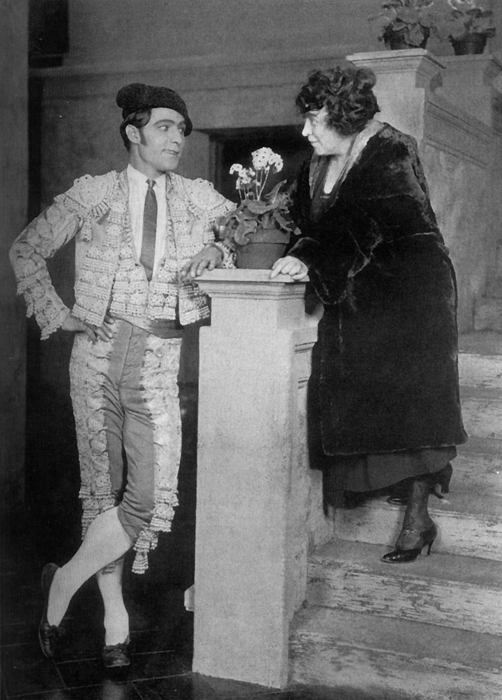
Valentino and June Mathis on the set of Blood and Sand (1922)

Valentino wrote an open letter that was published in the January 1923 issue of Photoplay magazine, arguing that repeated appearances in weak or formulaic films would damage his reputation. He emphasized that his stance was not primarily financially motivated, although his contract at the time paid $1,250 per week, which he noted was lower than those of several contemporaries, and the costs of maintaining a professional wardrobe and responding to fan correspondence left him with little surplus. Valentino said he would have continued working at the same salary if they had allowed him to "make real photoplays instead of making cut-and-dried program features, that can be hacked and torn and compressed into a given number of feet of film to fit so many can, like so many boxes of sardines".

Valentino explained that he rejected offers of higher pay—including an offer of $7,000 per week—when they were tied to continued participation in formulaic productions. Instead, he offered to return to work on his old salary if they permitted a certain writer and director to have the final say over films to be produced, but they refused. He further expressed disappointment with The Young Rajah, the last film completed before the strike, stating that the conflict arose too late to prevent a production he felt fell below his standards. He was also upset over the broken promise of filming Blood and Sand in Spain, and the failure to shoot the next proposed film in either Spain or at least New York. Valentino had hoped while filming in Europe, he could see his family, whom he had not seen in nearly 10 years.

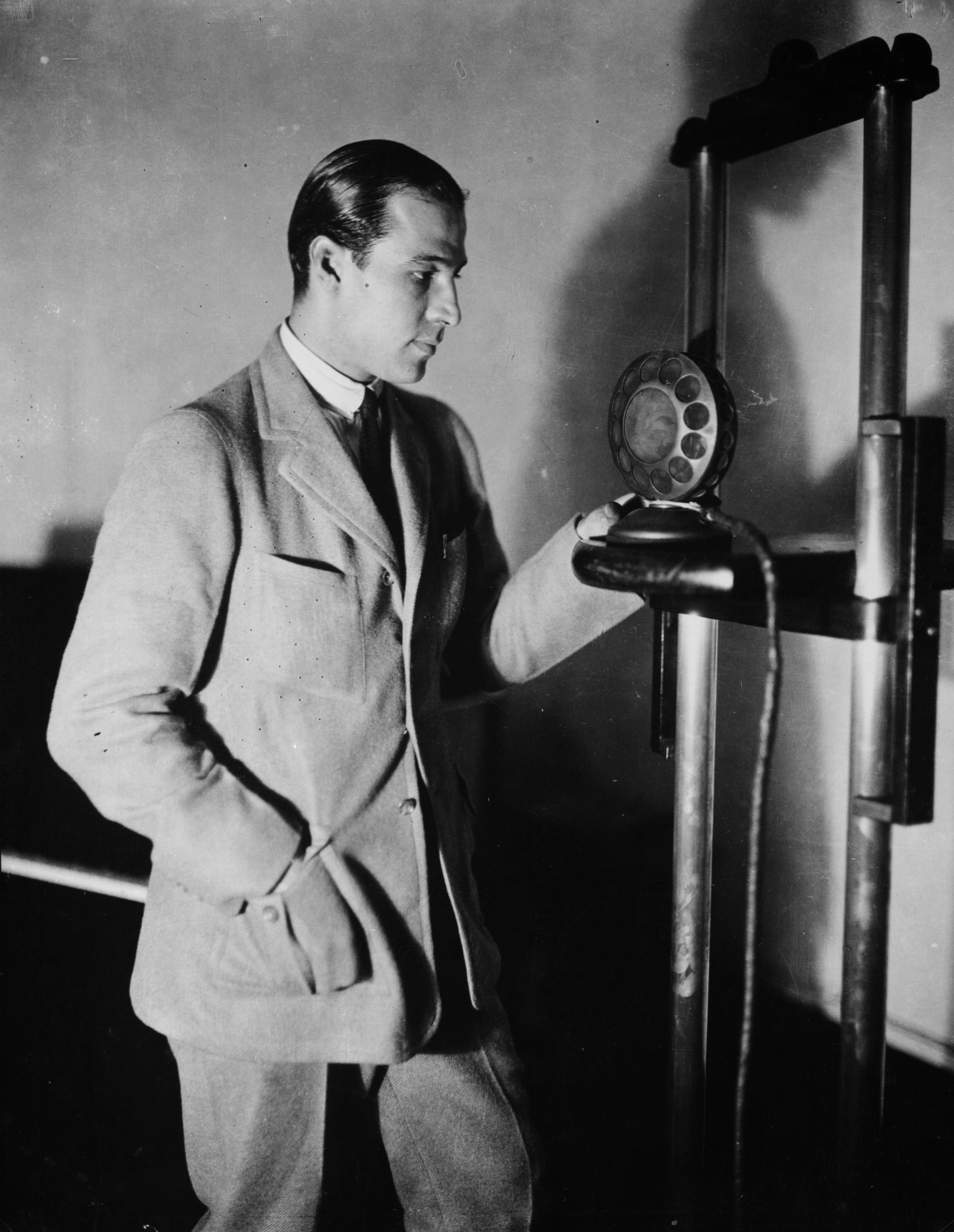
Valentino appearing on WSB's "The Voice of the South" in Atlanta, 1923

Famous Players–Lasky issued public statements portraying Valentino as more trouble than he was worth, citing his divorce proceedings, bigamy trial, and mounting debts, and characterizing him as prima donna and difficult. The studio maintained that it had done everything possible to support him and claimed credit for making him a major star. Valentino denied being temperamental or ungrateful, framing his stance as a matter of artistic responsibility rather than ego.

Despite this, other studios expressed interest in Valentino. Joseph Schenck considered casting his wife, Norma Talmadge, opposite Valentino in a proposed adaptation of Romeo and Juliet, while June Mathis, then at Goldwyn Pictures, explored casting him in Ben-Hur. However, Famous Players–Lasky exercised its contractual option to extend Valentino's agreement, barring him from accepting employment with other studios. By this point, Valentino was reportedly about $80,000 in debt. He filed an appeal challenging the contract extension, which was partially granted. Although he was prohibited from working as an actor, the ruling allowed him to pursue other forms of employment.

With his popularity rising and feeling misrepresented, Valentino embraced the emerging medium of radio as a publicity tool to voice his views and reach a wider audience, making appearances on U.S. radio broadcasts in major cities beginning in late 1922. In December 1922, he was mobbed by enthusiastic female admirers during a visit to Philadelphia and was escorted by police before addressing fans via the WIP radio station at Gimbel Brothers. In a speech over the radio Valentino said: "Seventy-five per cent of the pictures shown to-day are a brazen insult to the public's intelligence. Only a few, such as D. W. Griffith, the great master and pioneer, Douglas Fairbanks, Mary Pickford, Charlie Chaplin, Dick Barthelmess, and some other independent stars, directors, and producers deserve credit and encouragement from you."

Barred from filming, studio executives scrambled to find a replacement handsome leading man to capitalize on Valentino's absence. Dubbed "the Battle of the Sheiks," the search elevated a group of actors promoted as potential successors, including Ramón Novarro, Charles de Rochefort, Gabriel de Posse, Ivor Novello, Antonio Moreno, and Nigel Barrie.

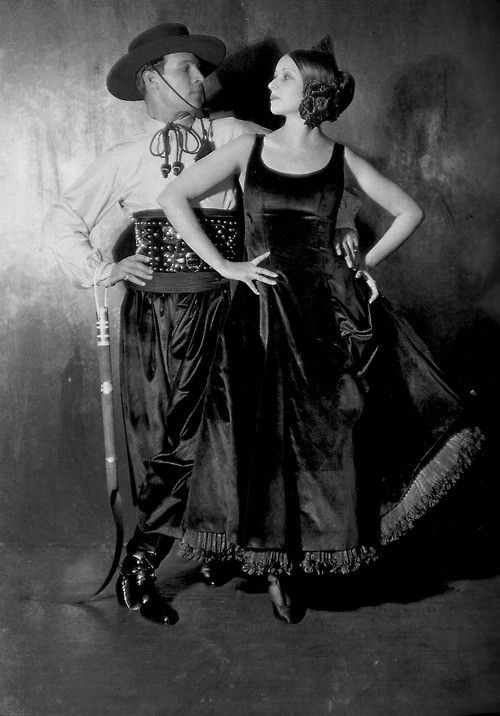
Valentino and Natacha Rambova photographed by James Abbe during the Mineralava tour in 1923

=== Mineralava dance tour ===
In late 1922, Valentino met S. George Ullman, who soon became his manager. Ullman, formerly associated with the Mineralava Beauty Clay Company, persuaded the firm that Valentino would be an ideal spokesman given his popularity with female fans. In March 1923, Valentino and Natacha Rambova were legally married, and that spring they embarked on a highly successful promotional tour, appearing in 88 cities across the United States and Canada. During the tour, Valentino made several radio appearances, allowing eager fans to hear his voice.

As part of the campaign, Valentino endorsed Mineralava products and served as a judge for Mineralava-sponsored beauty and dance contests, with local winners advancing to the national finals. The semi-finalists gathered in New York City, where a panel of judges selected the winner, and Valentino personally presented the prize at Madison Square Garden on November 28, 1923. The title was awarded to Norma Niblock of Toronto. The event was later documented in the short film Rudolph Valentino and his 88 American Beauties, produced by David O. Selznick.

=== Return to films and career challenges ===
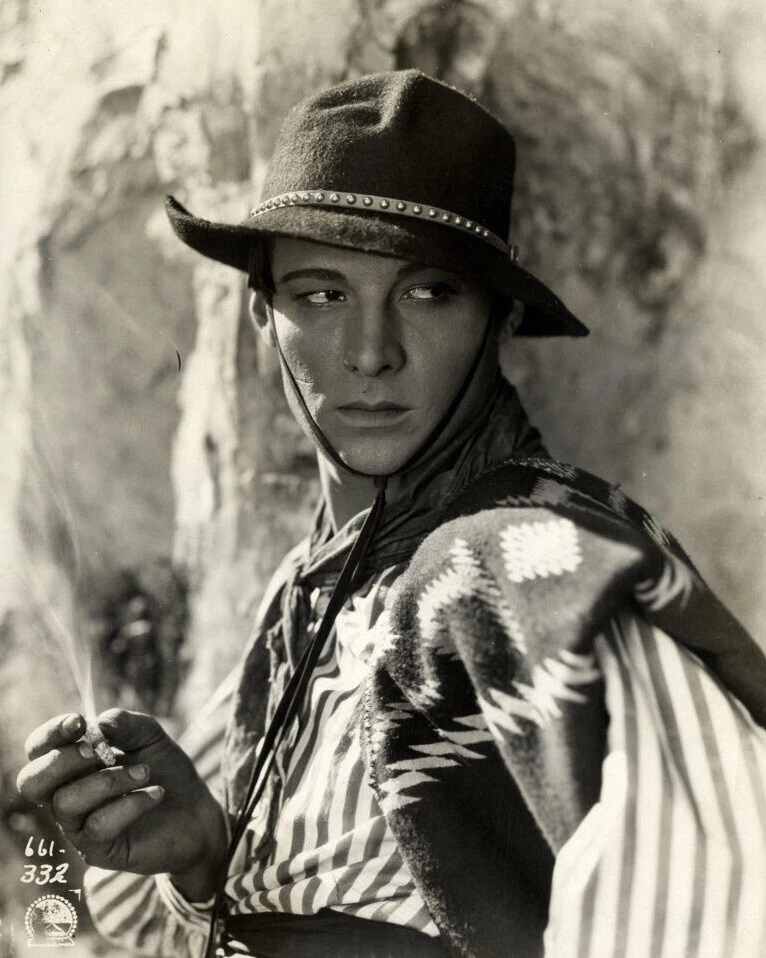
Publicity photo for A Sainted Devil (1924)

In July 1923, Valentino signed a contract with Ritz-Carlton Pictures, a newly formed subsidiary of the Ritz-Carlton hotel company established by J. D. Williams, which granted him greater artistic control over his film work. Williams negotiated an agreement with Famous Players–Lasky allowing Valentino to fulfill his existing contractual obligations while freeing him to enter a new arrangement with Ritz-Carlton Pictures.

Under the terms of the deal, Famous Players–Lasky exercised its option to retain Valentino for an additional year, during which he would star in two more films. His salary was set at $7,500 per week, effective immediately, with both films scheduled to be produced in New York in 1924. Valentino was granted input into the selection of directors and cast, and Rambova was to serve as designer and creative consultant. The agreement was formally celebrated at a dinner at the Ritz-Carlton Hotel. By accepting this deal, he turned down an offer to film an Italian production of Quo Vadis in Italy.

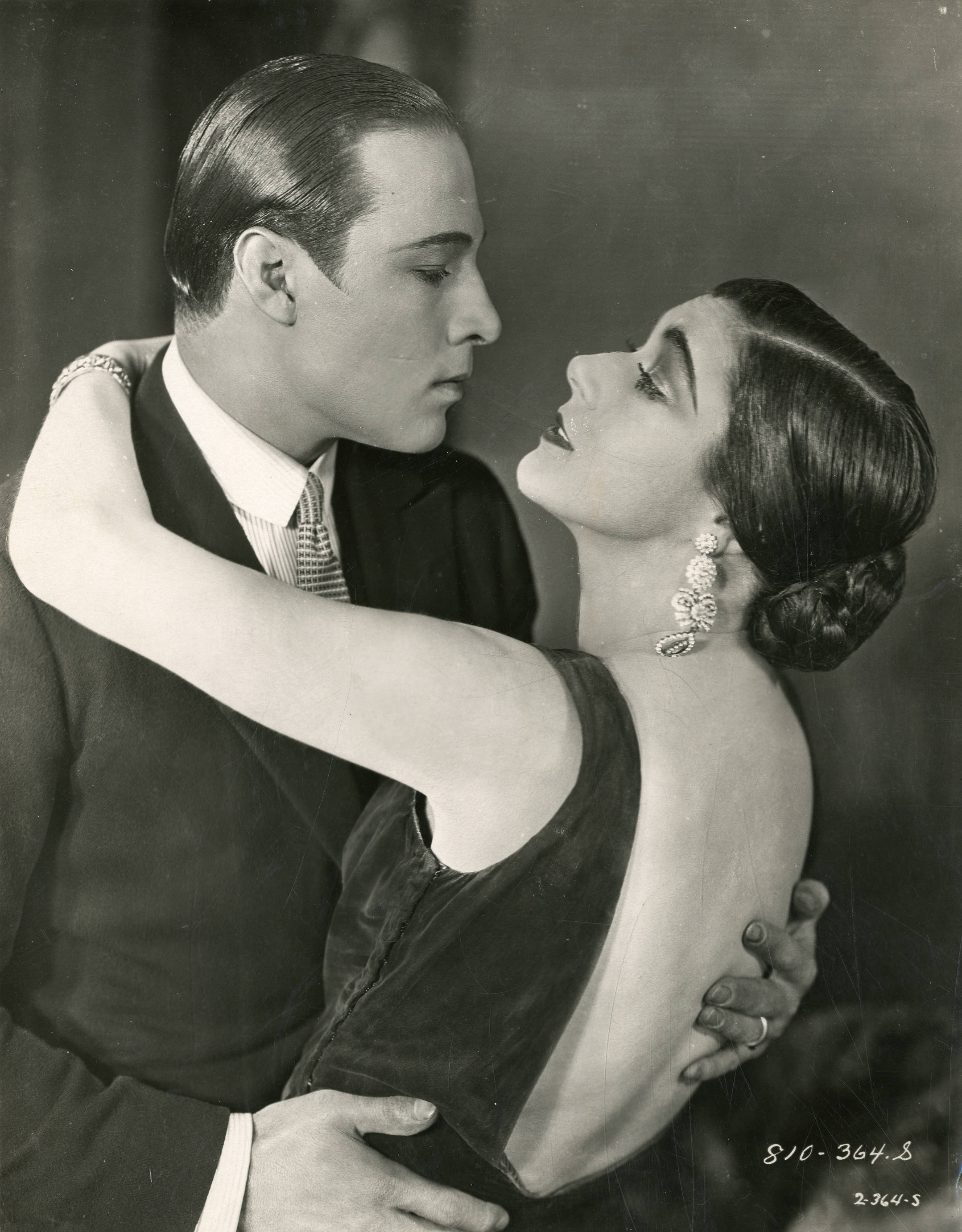
Film still of Valentino and Nita Naldi in Cobra (1925)

The first film under the new contract was Monsieur Beaucaire, wherein Valentino played the lead, the Duke of Chartres. The film did poorly and American audiences found it "effeminate". The failure of the film, under Rambova's control, is often seen as proof of her controlling nature and later caused her to be barred from Valentino sets. Valentino made one final movie for Famous Players. In 1924, he starred in A Sainted Devil, now one of his lost films. It had lavish costumes, but apparently a weak story. It opened to strong sales, but soon dropped off in attendance and ended up as another disappointment.

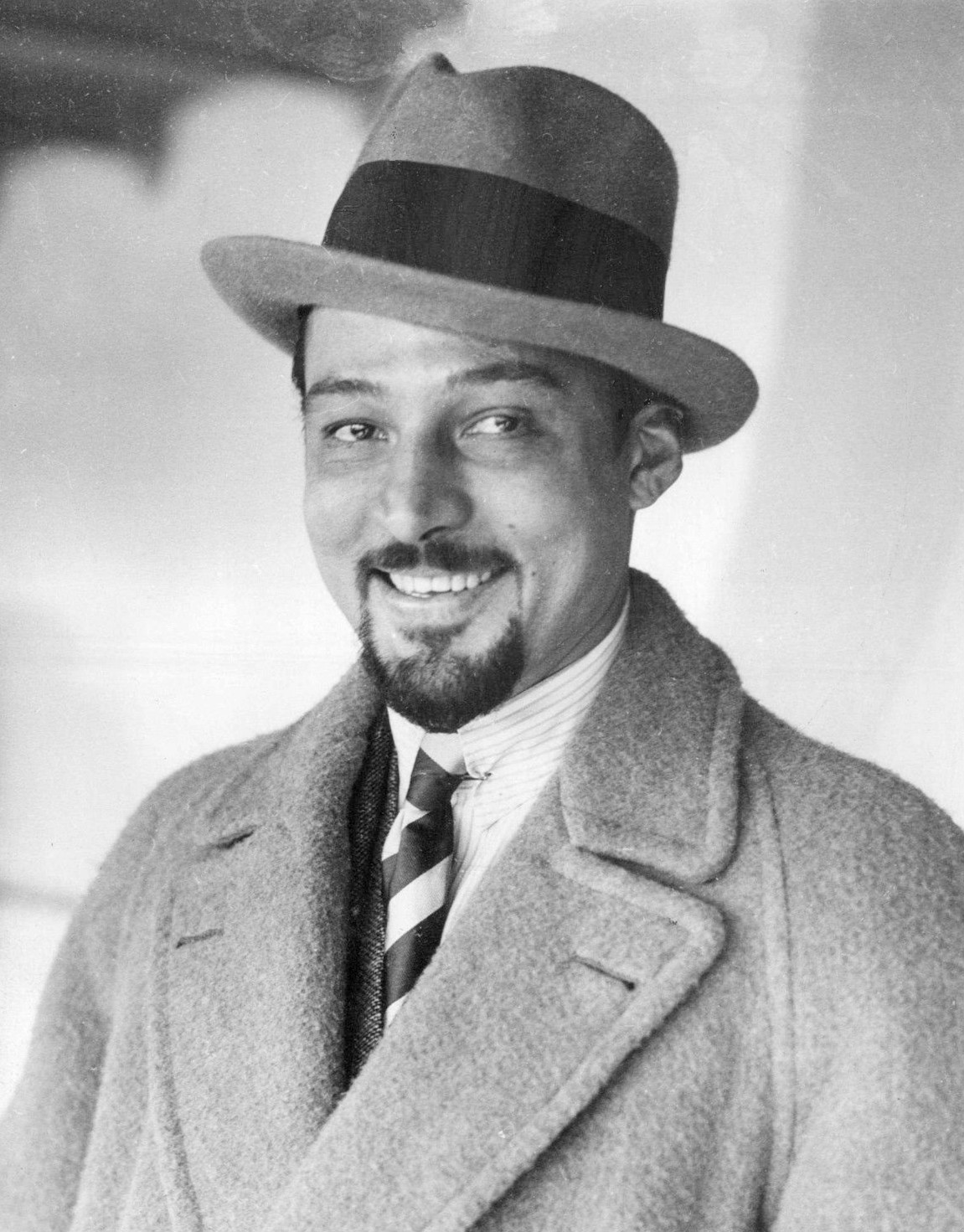
Valentino sporting a Van Dyke beard, 1924

With his contract fulfilled, Valentino was released from Famous Players, but was still obligated to Ritz-Carlton for four films. His next film was a pet project titled The Hooded Falcon. The production was beset with problems from the start, beginning with the script written by June Mathis. The Valentinos were dissatisfied with Mathis's version and requested that it be rewritten. Mathis took it as a great insult and did not speak to Valentino for almost two years.

While Rambova worked designing costumes and rewriting the script for Falcon, Valentino was persuaded to film Cobra with Nita Naldi in 1924. He agreed only on condition that it not be released until after The Hooded Falcon debuted. After filming Cobra, the cast of The Hooded Falcon sailed for France to be fitted for costumes. After three months, they returned to the United States, where Valentino's new beard, which he had grown for the film, caused a sensation in November 1924. "I opened once a paper and I tell you what was in. It was Rudolph Valentino with a beard upon his chin. My heart stopped off from beating and I fainted dead away, and I never want to come to life until the judgement day," was soon printed in Photoplay. The cast and crew left for Hollywood to begin preparations for the film, but much of the budget was taken up during preproduction. Due to the Valentinos' lavish spending on costumes and sets, Ritz-Carlton terminated the deal with the couple, effectively ending Valentino's contract with them.

=== United Artists and final films ===
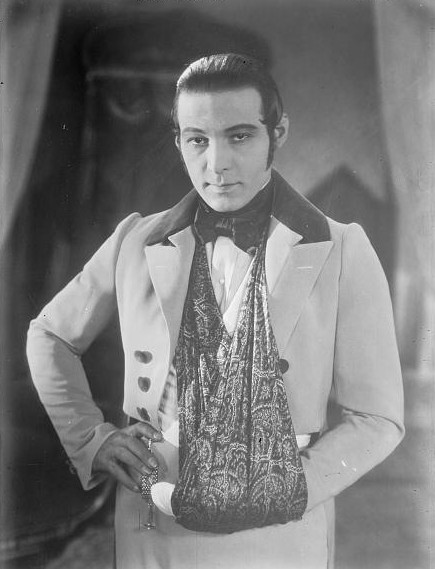
Valentino on set of The Eagle (1925)

During the filming of Monsieur Beaucaire, both Charlie Chaplin and Douglas Fairbanks approached Valentino privately, due to his contract with Ritz-Carlton, about joining with United Artists. Valentino's contract with United Artists provided $10,000 a week for only three pictures a year, plus a percentage of his films. The contract excluded Rambova from production of his films and the film set. Valentino's acceptance of the terms caused a major rift in his marriage to Rambova. Ullman, who had negotiated the contract with United Artists, offered Rambova $30,000 to finance a film of her own. It became her only film, titled What Price Beauty? and starred Myrna Loy.

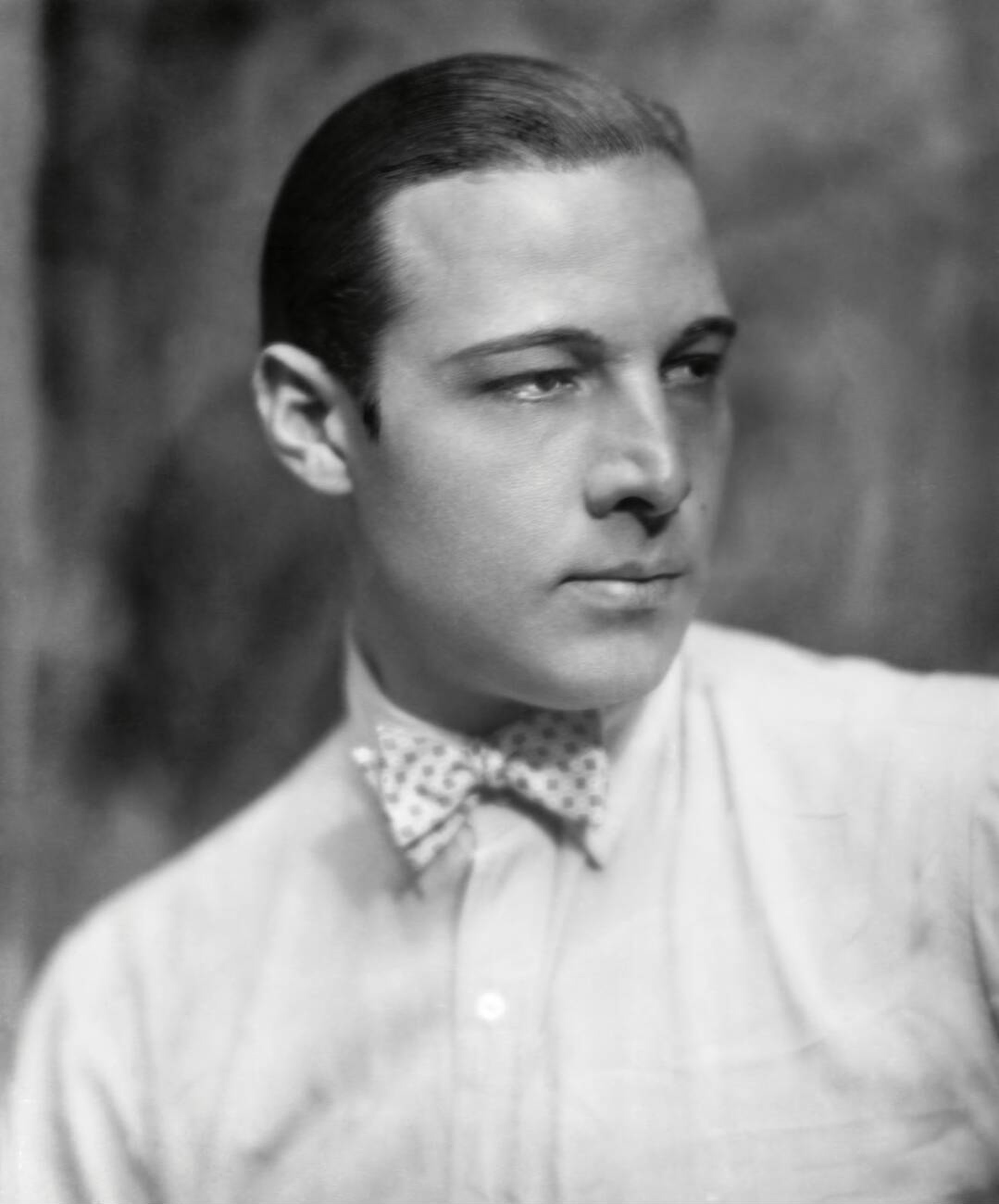
Valentino photographed by Henry Waxman, 1926

Valentino chose his first UA project, The Eagle. With the marriage under strain, Valentino began shooting and Rambova announced that she needed a "marital vacation." During the filming of The Eagle, rumors of an affair with co-star Vilma Bánky were reported and ultimately denied by both Bánky and Valentino. The film opened to positive reviews, but a moderate box office. For the film's release, Valentino travelled to London, staying there and in France, spending money with abandon while his divorce took place.

After his divorce was finalized, Valentino sailed back to the United States aboard the Leviathan, where he announced plans to make a new sheik film. Despite his hatred of the sheik image, he began shooting The Son of the Sheik in February 1926, with Valentino given his choice of director, and pairing him again with Vilma Bánky. The film used the authentic costumes he bought abroad and allowed him to play a dual role. Valentino was ill during production, but he needed the money to pay his many debts. The film opened on July 9, 1926, to great fanfare. During the premiere, Valentino was reconciled with Mathis; the two had not spoken in almost two years.

== Public image ==
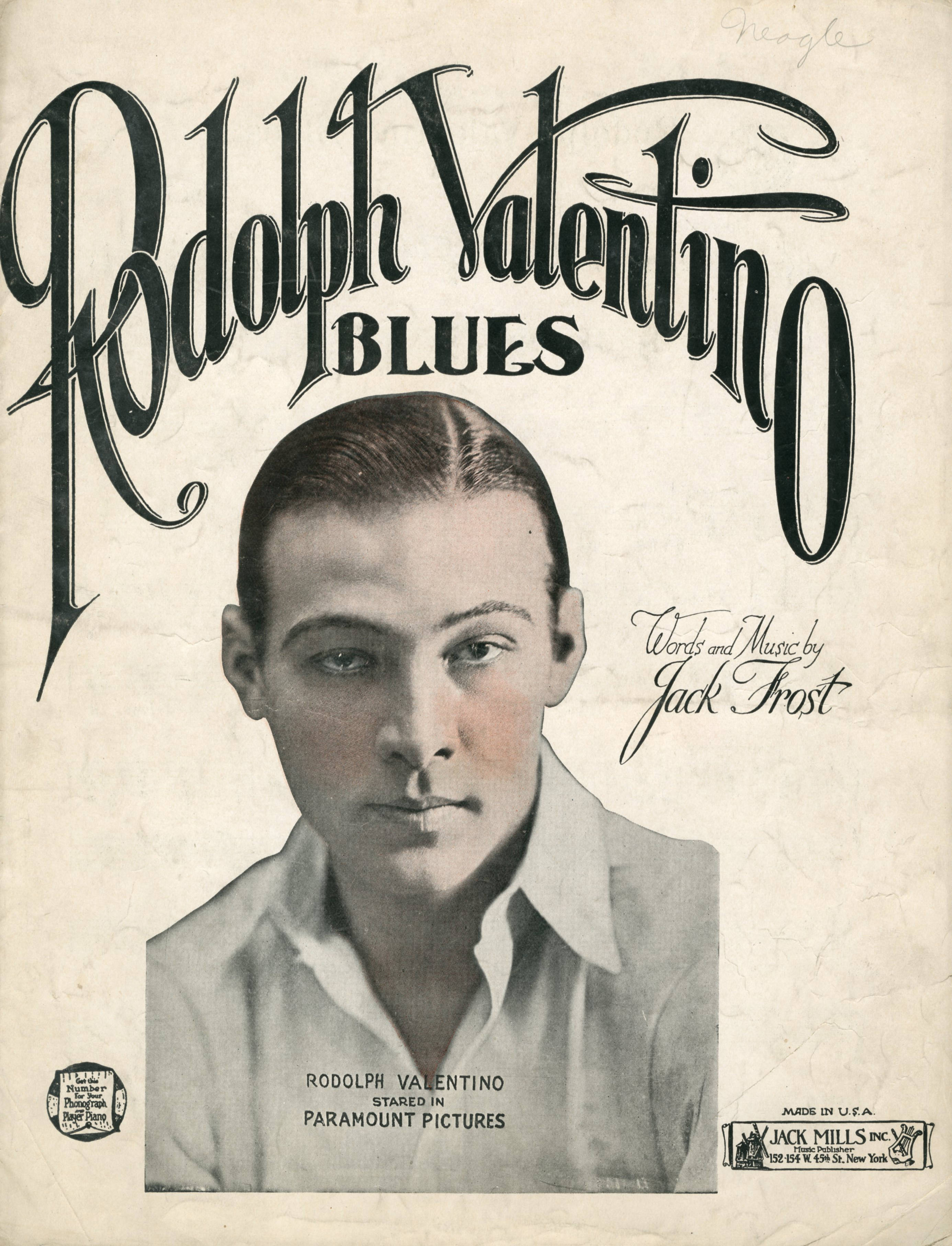
Sheet music cover for "Rodolph Valentino Blues" written in 1922: To quote the lyrics, "Oh Mister Rodolph Valentino / I know I've got the Valentino blues / And when you come up on the screen / Oh! You're so romantic, I go frantic at the views".

Dating back to the de Saulles trial in New York, during which his "masculinity" had been questioned in print, Valentino had been very sensitive about his public perception. With the Fairbanks-type being the supposed epitome of manhood, Valentino was sometimes portrayed as a threat to the "All American" man. One man, asked in a street interview in 1922 what he thought of Valentino, replied, "Many other men desire to be another Douglas Fairbanks. But Valentino? I wonder ..." Women in the same interview found Valentino "triumphantly seductive. Puts the love-making of the average husband or sweetheart into discard as tame, flat, and unimpassioned."

Some journalists were still calling his "masculinity" into question, going on at length about his pomaded hair, his dandyish clothing, his treatment of women, his views on women, and whether he was "effeminate". Valentino hated these stories and was known to carry clippings of the newspaper articles around with him and criticize them.

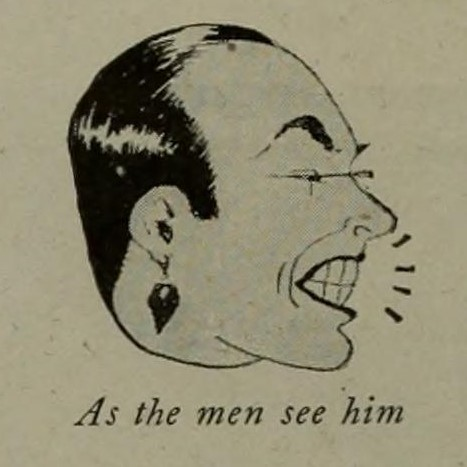
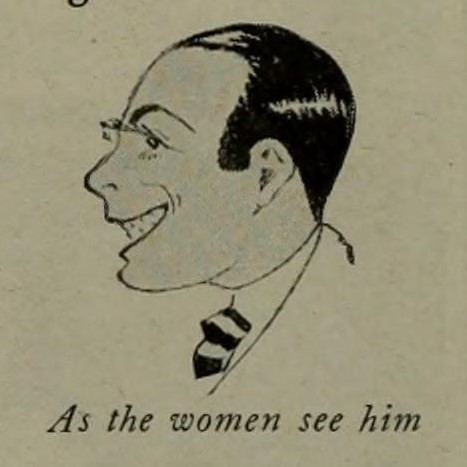
Caricatures of Valentino by Dick Dorgan, 1922

In July 1926, the Chicago Tribune reported that a vending machine dispensing pink talcum powder had been installed in the men's washroom of a ballroom in Chicago. An anonymous journalist used the anecdote to protest what was described as the feminization of American men and blamed the phenomenon on Valentino and his screen image. The editorial asked rhetorically, "Why didn't someone quietly drown Rudolph Guglielmo, alias Valentino, years ago?" and concluded, after an extended polemic, that "Rudy, the beautiful gardener's boy, is the prototype of the American male." The piece infuriated Valentino and he wrote an open letter challenging the writer to his choice of a boxing or wrestling match, since dueling was illegal. "This is not publicity. The man overstepped all bounds of decency and right thinking. I will go back to Chicago and give him what he deserves. Only one thing would prevent it-if he were feeble or old, or too young. If he is too old, he should have known better. If he is too young, I'll spank him. All journalists should be ashamed of him, whoever he is," he told a reporter.

Shortly afterward, Valentino met with journalist H. L. Mencken for advice on how best to deal with the incident. Mencken advised Valentino to "let the dreadful farce roll along to exhaustion," but Valentino insisted the editorial was "infamous." Mencken found Valentino to be likable and gentlemanly and wrote sympathetically of him in an article published in The Baltimore Sun a week after Valentino's death:

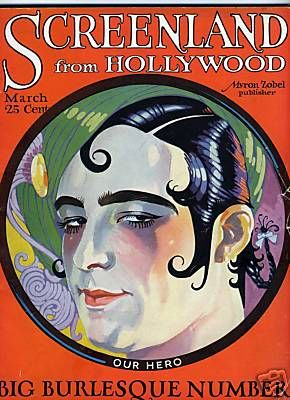
Illustration of Valentino on the cover of Screenland, March 1923

It was not that trifling Chicago episode that was riding him; it was the whole grotesque futility of his life. Had he achieved, out of nothing, a vast and dizzy success? Then that success was hollow as well as vast—a colossal and preposterous nothing. Was he acclaimed by yelling multitudes? Then every time the multitudes yelled he felt himself blushing inside ... The thing, at the start, must have only bewildered him, but in those last days, unless I am a worse psychologist than even the professors of psychology, it was revolting him. Worse, it was making him afraid ... Here was a young man who was living daily the dream of millions of other men. Here was one who was catnip to women. Here was one who had wealth and fame. And here was one who was very unhappy.

When the writer failed to respond, Valentino sought to assert his masculinity by staging a boxing match in New York City against New York Evening Journal boxing writer Frank "Buck" O'Neil, with heavyweight champion Jack Dempsey serving as referee before an assembled group of reporters. Valentino won the bout, which took place on the roof of New York's Ambassador Hotel. Dempsey, who trained Valentino and other Hollywood notables of the era in boxing, said of him: "He was the most virile and masculine of men. The women were like flies to a honeypot. He could never shake them off, anywhere he went. What a lovely, lucky guy."

Valentino's sex symbol status and his untimely death were a biographical part in John Dos Passos' The Big Money in the U.S.A. trilogy. His title was the Adagio Dancer.

== Other creative pursuits and productions ==
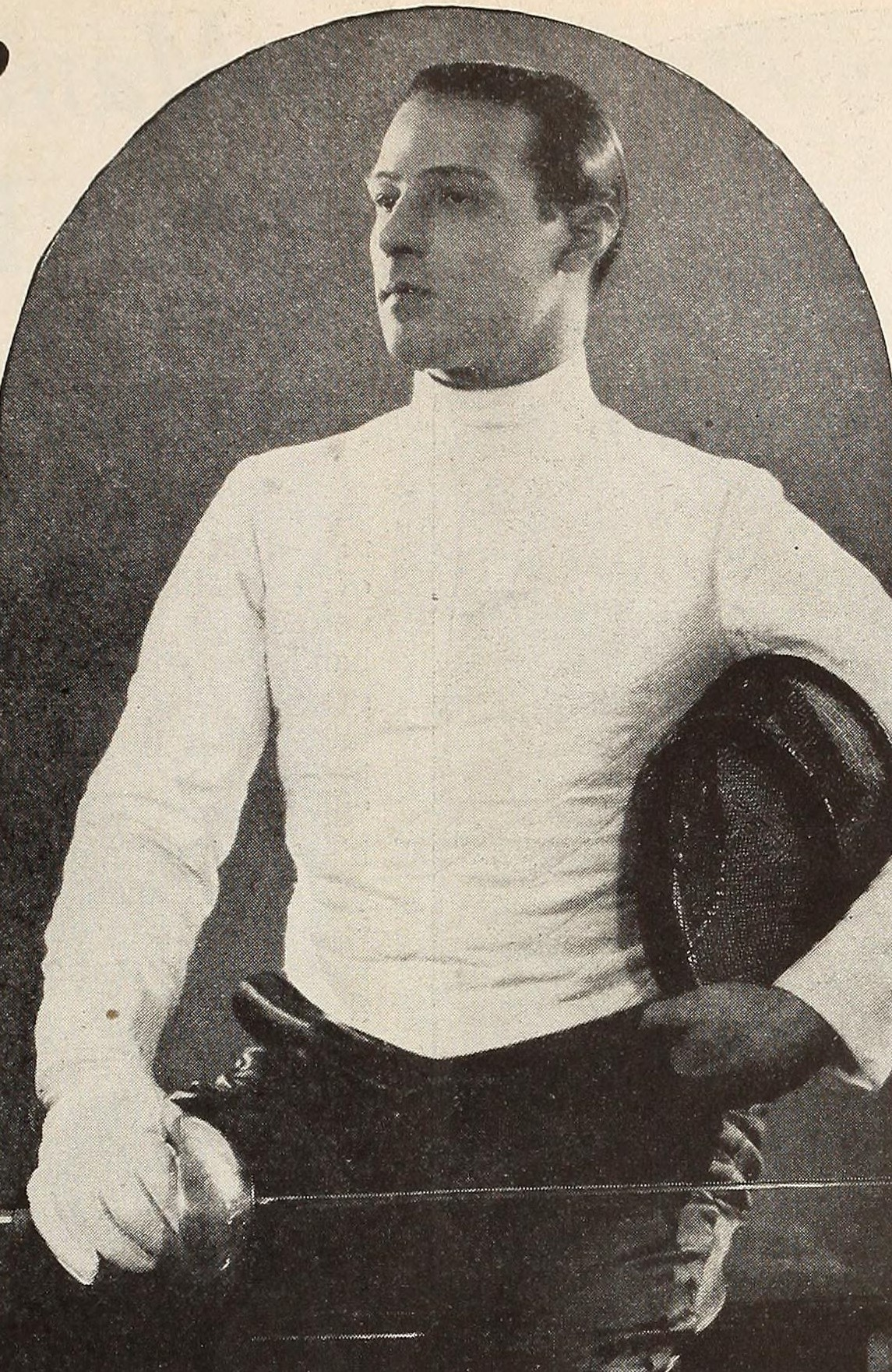
Photo of Valentino in fencing gear, Picture Play Magazine, September 1928

In 1923, Valentino published a book of poetry titled Day Dreams. He later serialized events in various magazines. With Liberty magazine, he wrote a series entitled "How You Can Keep Fit" in 1923. "My Life Story" was serialized in Photoplay from February to April 1923. The March issue was one of the best-selling ever for the magazine. He followed that with "My Private Diary", serialized in Movie Weekly magazine. Most of the serials were later published as books after his death.

Valentino was fascinated with every part of movie-making. During production on a Mae Murray film, he spent time studying the director's plans. He craved authenticity and wished to shoot on location, finally forming his own production company, Rudolph Valentino Productions, in 1925. Valentino, S. George Ullman, and Beatrice Ullman were the incorporators.

On May 14, 1923, while in New York City, Valentino made his only two vocal recordings for Brunswick Records; "Kashmiri Song" (The Sheik) and "El Relicario" (Blood and Sand). The recordings were not released until after Valentino's death by the Celebrity Recording Company; Brunswick did not release them because Valentino's English/Spanish pronunciation was subpar.

Valentino was one of the first in Hollywood to offer an award for artistic accomplishments in films; the Academy Awards later followed suit. In 1925, he gave out his only medal to actor John Barrymore for his performance in the 1924 film Beau Brummel. The award, named the Rudolph Valentino Medal, required the agreement of Valentino, two judges, and the votes of 75 critics. Everyone other than Valentino himself was eligible.

== Personal life ==
Valentino was part of a close-knit Hollywood social circle that included Charlie Chaplin, John Barrymore, Mary Pickford, Douglas Fairbanks, Alma Rubens, Harry d'Arrast, Harry Crocker, and gossip columnist Louella Parsons. The group met several times a week at the home of actress Marion Davies.

Parsons later recalled that Valentino was "perhaps the quietest and most reserved member of our little group," describing him as "a strange, introspective boy—he was little more than that—Rudy had the world of women at his feet. And yet was never happy in his personal love life." According to Parsons, Valentino once explained his romantic unhappiness with characteristic resignation: "The women I love don't love me. The others don't matter."

Writing about his friend Valentino, Chaplin observed, "Valentino had an air of sadness. He wore his success gracefully, appearing almost subdued by it. He was intelligent, quiet, and without vanity... No man had greater attraction for women than Valentino; no man was more deceived by them."

=== Marriage to Jean Acker ===
On November 5, 1919, shortly after midnight, Valentino married actress Jean Acker in Hollywood during a party held for Richard A. Rowland, president of Metro Pictures, at the home of film producer Maxwell Karger. The couple had met a few months earlier at a gathering hosted by Pauline Frederick in September. After some time, they met again while he was completing the film Once to Every Woman. "I fell in love with her. I think you might call it love at first sight," he said. He proposed while the pair were horseback riding in Beverly Hills, and Acker agreed to marry him. According to the Los Angeles Times, Valentino had "pressed the issue for two long months." Acker reportedly entered into the marriage in part to distance herself from a romantic triangle involving actresses Grace Darmond and Alla Nazimova. She soon regretted the decision, and on their wedding night, locked Valentino out of their hotel room.

Following their separation on their wedding night, Valentino refused to accept that Acker's rejection was final and wrote a letter urging her to return. The pair encountered each other by chance at a party in December 1919, and according to actor Douglas Gerrard, Valentino was so encouraged that he invited friends to join them at the Alexandria Hotel to celebrate their reconciliation. They spent the night of December 5 under the same roof, but Valentino told Gerrard the following day that Acker had left him again. When Gerrard later asked Acker why she could not live with her husband, she reportedly replied, "He's impossible, he's dictatorial." Despite this, Acker sent Valentino telegrams and letters with sweet messages and telling him she missed him, yet she avoided seeing him in person.

By the time they appeared in divorce court in 1921, each accusing the other of desertion, circumstances had shifted. Valentino had become a famous film star, while Acker was ill and in debt, unable to work. Acker testified, "He deserted me. He was nothing when I married and when he arrived he lost interest in me." Valentino rebutted her claims and responded that a "financial settlement is the impelling motive of her action." The judge ruled in Valentino's favor, granting him a divorce and denying Acker separate maintenance on January 10, 1922. Since Acker was destitute, Valentino agreed to cover her medical bills and temporarily pay $175 per month in alimony.

Reflecting on his relationship with Acker, Valentino later remarked, "Mine was not a marriage. It was a ridiculous tragedy." He subsequently criticized himself for failing to seek an immediate annulment. In November 1922, Acker sought legal recognition of her right to use the name Mrs. Valentino, which Valentino opposed. She later toured in vaudeville, billing herself as "Mrs. Rodolph Valentino" in 1923. Despite her actions, the two eventually rekindled a cordial relationship following Valentino's second divorce. After his death, Acker wrote a song in his memory titled "We Will Meet at the End of the Trail."

=== Marriage to Natacha Rambova ===
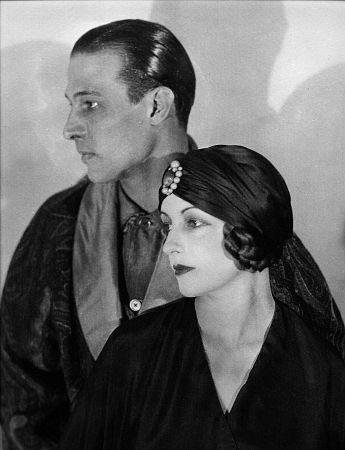
Valentino and his second wife, Natacha Rambova, 1923

Valentino first met designer Natacha Rambova (born Winifred Shaughnessy) while filming Uncharted Seas in 1921. The two were introduced by actress and producer Alla Nazimova and subsequently collaborated on Nazimova's production of Camille. Eventually, a romantic relationship developed after they formed a friendship based on shared interests. They married on May 13, 1922, in Mexicali, Mexico, which resulted in Valentino's arrest for bigamy, since he had obtained only an interlocutory decree of divorce and not a final divorce judgment (which could be obtained only after an year had passed from the interlocutory decree of divorce). Days passed, and his studio Famous Players–Lasky refused to post bail, so eventually a few friends posted the cash bail. He was also investigated for a possible violation of the Mann Act.

Having to wait a year or face the possibility of being arrested again, Rambova and Valentino lived separately until they were legally remarried at the Lake County Court House in Crown Point, Indiana, on March 14, 1923. Many of Valentino's friends disliked Rambova and found her controlling. During his relationship with her, he lost many friends and business associates, including June Mathis. Towards the end of their marriage, Rambova was banned from his sets by contract.

While Valentino was in California filming The Eagle in 1925, Rambova went to New York to prepare for the release of her first film, What Price Beauty? In August 1925, Rambova initially dismissed speculation that the pair were divorcing, telling reporters from their shared New York apartment at 270 Park Avenue that the separation was temporary—"a sort of marital vacation"—adding, "I'm sure this marital holiday will be a good thing for us both." Her decision to sail alone to Europe soon afterward fueled rumors that their marriage was in trouble.

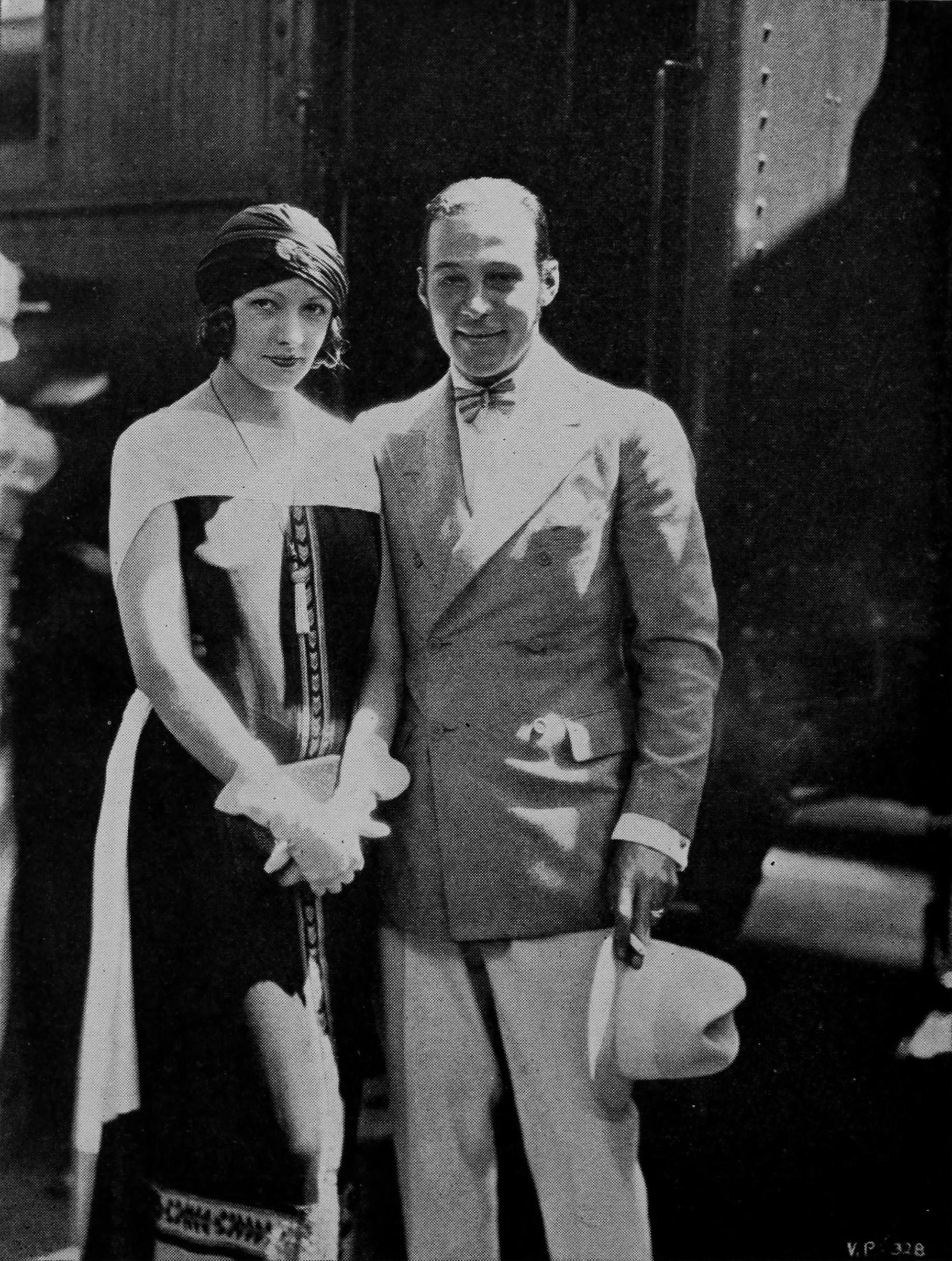
Valentino bids farewell to Rambova in Los Angeles as she departs by train for New York, shortly before she announced their separation, 1925.

In October 1925, however, Rambova filed for divorce in France. The following month, through her manager, Daniel Carson Goodman, Rambova issued a statement saying, "I will neither deny nor confirm the report that I will divorce Rudolph Valentino. I will say, however, that I want to devote myself exclusively to my career in the films. ... The public can draw its own conclusions." Valentino issued a statement confirming that he would not contest her suit and then immediately traveled to Europe to establish legal residency, allowing the divorce to proceed under French law:

Mrs. Valentino has for some time been bent upon having an individual artistic and professional career. She has also known that my position in regard to that is unalterable, namely that it would interfere with an ideal home life and also that I would not stand in the way of her having a career in freedom from marital ties. My position has been consistently that I wish for a mate, a home-maker, rather than a business partner. ... There is no plan on my part at this time to consider a marriage to anyone else. The time will come probably, but it is far off. When that time comes, I will choose to have a wife whose tastes are thoroughly domestic, and who is inclined to have children.

While in Europe, Valentino subleased his New York apartment in December 1925. That same month, divorce proceedings began in Paris, with Rambova filing on the grounds of incompatibility. On January 19, 1926, she was granted a divorce on the grounds of abandonment. The end of the marriage was bitter, with Valentino bequeathing Rambova one dollar in his will.

=== Sexuality ===
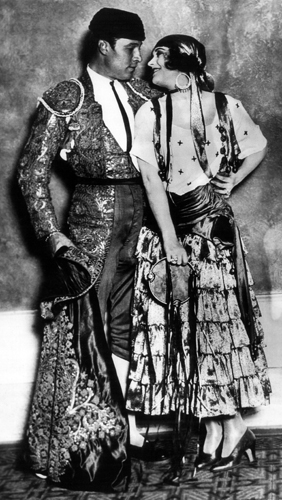
Valentino and Pola Negri won first prize in a costume party held at the Biltmore Hotel in 1926.

From the time he died in 1926 until the 1960s, Valentino's sexuality was not generally questioned in print. At least four books, including the notoriously libelous Hollywood Babylon, suggested that he may have been gay despite his marriages. For some, his unions to Jean Acker and Natacha Rambova add to the suspicion that Valentino was gay and that these were "lavender marriages".

Some writers have speculated that Valentino had a romantic relationship with Mexican actor Ramón Novarro, despite Novarro stating they barely knew each other. Sensational accounts—most notably in Hollywood Babylon—claimed that Valentino had given Novarro an art-deco dildo, allegedly discovered at the time of Novarro's murder; historians generally agree that no such object existed and regard the story as unfounded.

Additional claims have suggested that Valentino may have had relationships with roommates Paul Ivano and Douglas Gerrard, as well as with Norman Kerry and French theatre director Jacques Hébertot. Ivano, however, denied these assertions, stating that both he and Valentino were heterosexual. Biographers Emily Leider and Allan Ellenberger generally conclude that Valentino was most likely heterosexual.

Assertions of further evidence regarding Valentino's sexuality arose from documents in the estate of author Samuel Steward, which claimed that he and Valentino had been sexually involved. The account was later disputed after records showed that Valentino was in New York on the date Steward said the encounter occurred in Ohio, undermining the claim's credibility.

Shortly before his death, Valentino was dating Ziegfeld Follies showgirl Marion Wilson Benda while he was also involved in a relationship with Polish actress Pola Negri. Upon his death, Negri made a scene at his funeral, claiming they had been engaged, in spite of the fact that Valentino himself had never mentioned this engagement to anyone.

=== Attempts at military service and citizenship ===
Valentino's absence from military service during World War I was attributed to a minor vision defect in his left eye, which led Italian authorities to reject his offer of enlistment. The condition, however, did not affect his work as an actor. He later attempted to join the British aid service and, subsequently, sought to enlist under U.S. draft regulations, but was turned away in both cases, apparently for the same medical reason. Afterwards, Valentino made a final unsuccessful effort to enter Italian service through the assistance of the Italian Consul General.

In November 1925, Valentino formally filed paperwork in New York to begin the process of becoming a United States citizen, submitting a Declaration of Intention at the federal building as the first step toward naturalization, but the process was never completed before his death. His application was deferred after he received an honorary discharge from the Italian government, absolving him of all military obligations, past and present. The action was taken to counter a rumor circulating in his hometown during World War I that he had failed to enlist, and Valentino postponed pursuing U.S. citizenship until his record was formally cleared of any perceived stain.

== Death ==
=== Hospitalization ===
On August 15, 1926, Valentino collapsed shortly before noon in his apartment at the Hotel Ambassador on Park Avenue in Manhattan. He had suffered an attack of stomach trouble six weeks earlier but did not consider it serious. His valet summoned help and notified Barclay Warburton Jr., a friend of the actor, who arrived along with Valentino's manager, S. George Ullman, and Ullman's wife. Physician Dr. Paul E. Durham was called, followed by Dr. Harold D. Meeker, and arrangements were made to transfer Valentino to the New York Polyclinic Hospital.

Valentino was taken to the hospital by private ambulance at approximately 4:30 pm and underwent emergency surgery about an hour later. The operation involved suturing a perforated ulcer and removing his appendix. His condition would later be described as "Valentino's syndrome," in which perforated ulcers mimic appendicitis. He did not regain consciousness until late that evening. Upon awakening, Valentino reportedly asked about an editorial in the Chicago Tribune that had questioned his masculinity, inquiring of Dr. Durham, "Doctor, am I a 'Pink Puff'?" Durham replied that he had been "very brave." Following surgery, doctors reported that peritonitis had developed, but it was being monitored. Valentino's condition was described as "fair" shortly before midnight, though physicians warned that the next 48 hours would be critical in determining whether the infection would spread.

I have been deeply touched by the many telegrams, cables and letters that have come to my bedside. It is wonderful to know that have so many friends and well-wishers both among those it has been my privilege to meet and among the loyal unknown thousands who have seen me on the screen and whom I have never seen at all. Some of the tributes that have affected me the most have come from my 'fan' friends—men, women and little children. God bless them. Indeed, I feel that my, recovery, has been greatly advanced by the encouragement given me by everyone.

— Statement from Rudolph Valentino (August 19, 1926)

On August 19, Valentino's doctors released a bulletin stating that he was making satisfactory progress and, having passed the most critical period, no further updates would be issued unless something unexpected developed. After receiving this assessment, Valentino issued a statement through his manager.

His health declined sharply on August 21, when he suffered a severe relapse of pleuritis that rapidly affected his left lung. Although his doctors recognized that his condition was now fatal, they chose not to inform him. In the early hours of August 23, Valentino briefly regained consciousness at 3:30am and optimistically told Dr. Meeker that he was looking forward to going on vacation. The doctors then administered a hypodermic injection to induce sleep, and he rested until about 6:00am. Shortly thereafter, Joseph M. Schenck, chairman of the board of United Artists, and Ullman, entered the room. When Ullman attempted to lower the window shade, Valentino objected, saying, "Don't pull down the shade. I am feeling fine."

According to Meeker, Valentino did not speak another word in English after that point. At intervals he cried out in Italian, which those at his bedside did not understand, and at about 8:00am he slipped into a coma. When surgeons saw his condition was worsening, they summoned Father Joseph M. Congedo of the Church of the Sacred Hearts of Jesus and Mary at 10am to administer the last rites. They also summoned Father Edward F. Leonard of St. Malachy Roman Catholic Church before Valentino died at 12:10pm at the age of 31. The immediate causes of death were peritonitis and septic endocarditis, an infection of the heart tissues.

Valentino's body was placed in a plain wicker basket, draped with cloth of gold, and taken to the Frank E. Campbell Funeral Chapel. Large crowds remained outside the hospital, hoping to witness the removal of his body, but it was taken from the building through a private entrance on West 51st Street.

=== Media coverage and public reaction ===
During the eight days of his illness, Valentino lay in a hospital room filled with flowers sent by admirers from across the country. Thousands of letters and telegrams were received at the hospital, and his condition became a matter of national interest. A private detective had to be stationed outside Valentino's eighth-floor hospital suite after several acquaintances attempted to gain access to his room. To manage the crowds of women and girls seeking information, the hospital established an information bureau in the ground-floor lobby. Newspapers published frequent front-page bulletins, with even minor changes in his health reported prominently due to intense public concern.

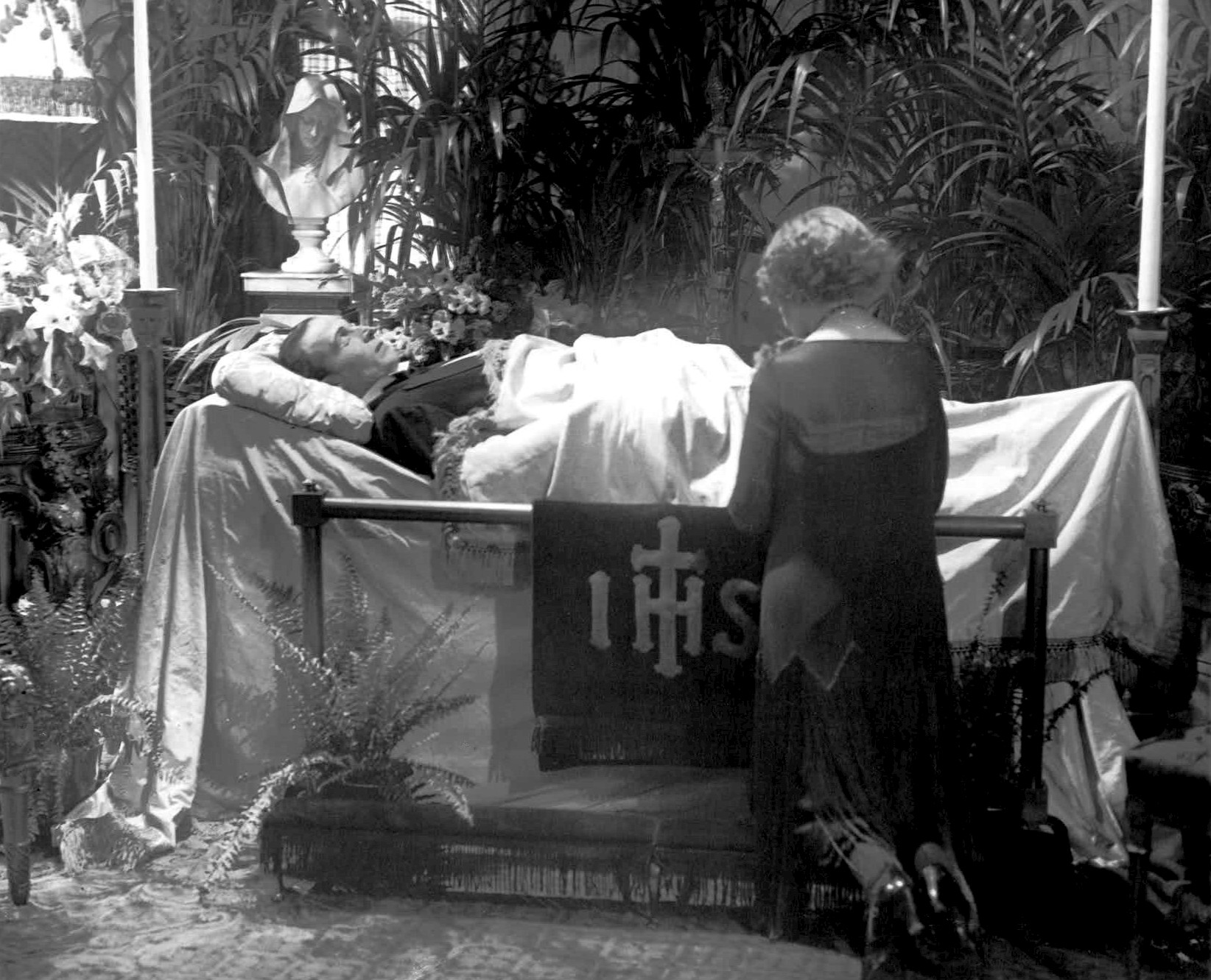
A fan named Eva Miller kneels at Valentino's coffin as he lies in state at Frank E. Campbell Funeral Chapel in New York City, 1926.

The hospital switchboard was overwhelmed with calls about Valentino's condition, prompting him, through his manager, to send chocolates to the operators in appreciation. Two additional operators were assigned to the hospital's telephone switchboard to handle the volume of calls. Concern came from across civic and film circles: New York City mayor Jimmy Walker inquired by telephone, while colleagues and friends, including Gloria Swanson, Marion Davies, Mae Marsh, Douglas Fairbanks, Mary Pickford, and Charlie Chaplin sent messages of sympathy and encouragement. Actress Vilma Bánky requested hourly updates on the status of his condition. Actress Pola Negri, who was reported to be Valentino's fiancée, sent a lengthy message and made several long-distance telephone calls about his condition. Valentino's first wife, Jean Acker, forwarded a package of embroidered bedding, while his second wife, Natacha Rambova, conveyed her well-wishes by cablegram.

Media coverage of Valentino's illness and death was widely criticized as sensationalist. Newspapers issued frequent bulletins on his condition, often exaggerating developments or publishing unverified claims to attract readers. The New York Evening Graphic was singled out in particular for its excesses, at one point informing readers that "the whole Valentino scare was a publicity stunt." A headline proclaimed, "Pan Rudy's Fight as Publicity," asserting that Valentino's illness was trivial and had been exaggerated to promote his recent film, The Son of the Sheik. Hospital officials denied these claims. Contemporary critics argued that such reporting transformed Valentino's medical crisis into a spectacle, exemplifying the worst practices of yellow journalism and the commercial exploitation of celebrity tragedy.

In the days following Valentino's death, rumors circulated widely in New York suggesting that the official medical explanation concealed more sinister causes. Press reports speculated that he had been poisoned by a jealous woman, injured in a fight, or even shot during a fight at a "gay party." In response to these claims, Assistant District Attorney Ferdinand H. Pecora stated that, if formally requested, he would conduct an investigation to confirm or refute the rumors, which were ultimately unsupported by evidence.

=== Tributes ===
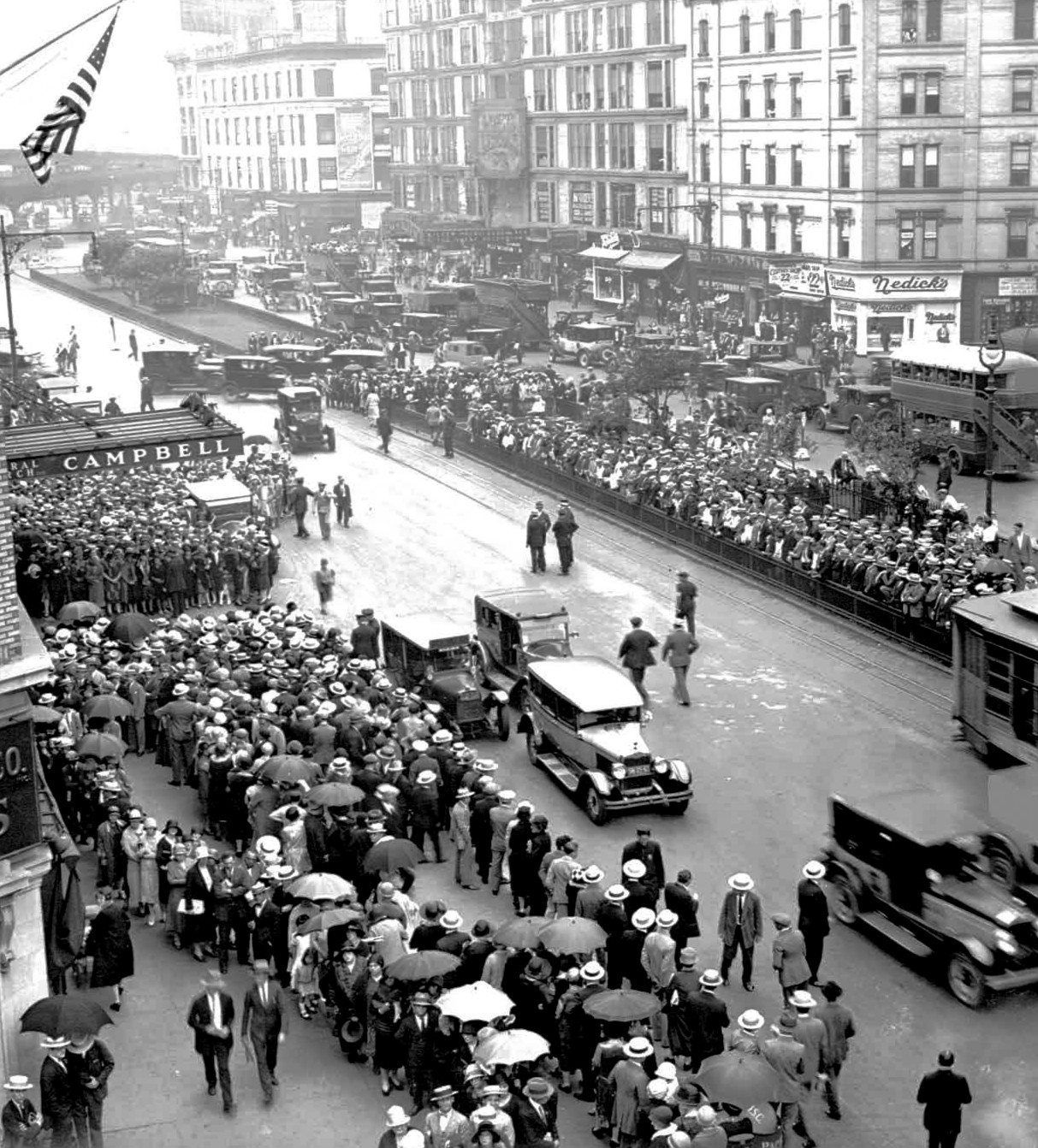
Crowds gathered at the Frank E. Campbell Funeral Chapel in New York City for Valentino's funeral, 1926

Valentino's death prompted an immediate outpouring of tributes across the film industry. News outlets reported on August 24, that the loss, despite grim reports in the preceding days, came as a shock to his friends and colleagues. Charlie Chaplin called it "one of the greatest tragedies that has occurred in the history of the motion-picture industry." Vilma Bánky said, "Playing opposite Rudolph Valentino taught me the meaning of courtesy and consideration in a fellow actor. He was one of the screen's greatest lovers; he also was one of Hollywood's most perfect gentlemen." Mae Murray said, "Valentino's greatest quality was a deep sincerity underlying a great strength of character." Buster Keaton said, "Death chose a shining mark when it robbed the world of Rudy Valentino. He was a real man, the soul of fairness." Gloria Swanson described Valentino as "a real artist, a charming gentleman, a true sportsman and a good friend," adding that both the industry and the public had suffered a great loss. John Considine, supervisor of Valentino's United Artists productions, stated that the actor often expressed a premonition of dying young. Additional statements were issued by leading figures, including Cecil B. DeMille, Samuel Goldwyn, Jesse L. Lasky, Sid Grauman, Will H. Hays, Major Edward Bowes, June Mathis, Joseph M. Schenck, David Belasco, Hiram Abrams, and Adolph Zukor.

The day Valentino died, director Sidney Olcott temporarily halted the production on his current film in tribute. The next day, WNYC radio station in New York City held what was likely the first radio memorial service. The Los Angeles Breakfast Club conducted 10-minutes services for Valentino, who was a member of the organization.

=== Funeral ===
An estimated 100,000 people lined the streets of Manhattan to pay their respects at his funeral, handled by the Frank E. Campbell Funeral Chapel. Suicides of despondent fans were reported. Windows were smashed as fans tried to get in and an all-day riot erupted on August 24. Over 100 mounted officers and NYPD's Police Reserve were used to restore order. A phalanx of officers lined the streets for the remainder of the viewing. Actress Pola Negri, claiming to be Valentino's fiancée, collapsed in hysterics while standing over his $10,000 coffin, where she had installed an 11-foot-long bank of lilies that spelled out her name at the bier. Campbell hired actors to impersonate a Fascist Blackshirt honor guard, purportedly sent by Benito Mussolini. Media reports that the body on display in the main salon was not Valentino but a decoy were continually denied by Campbell.

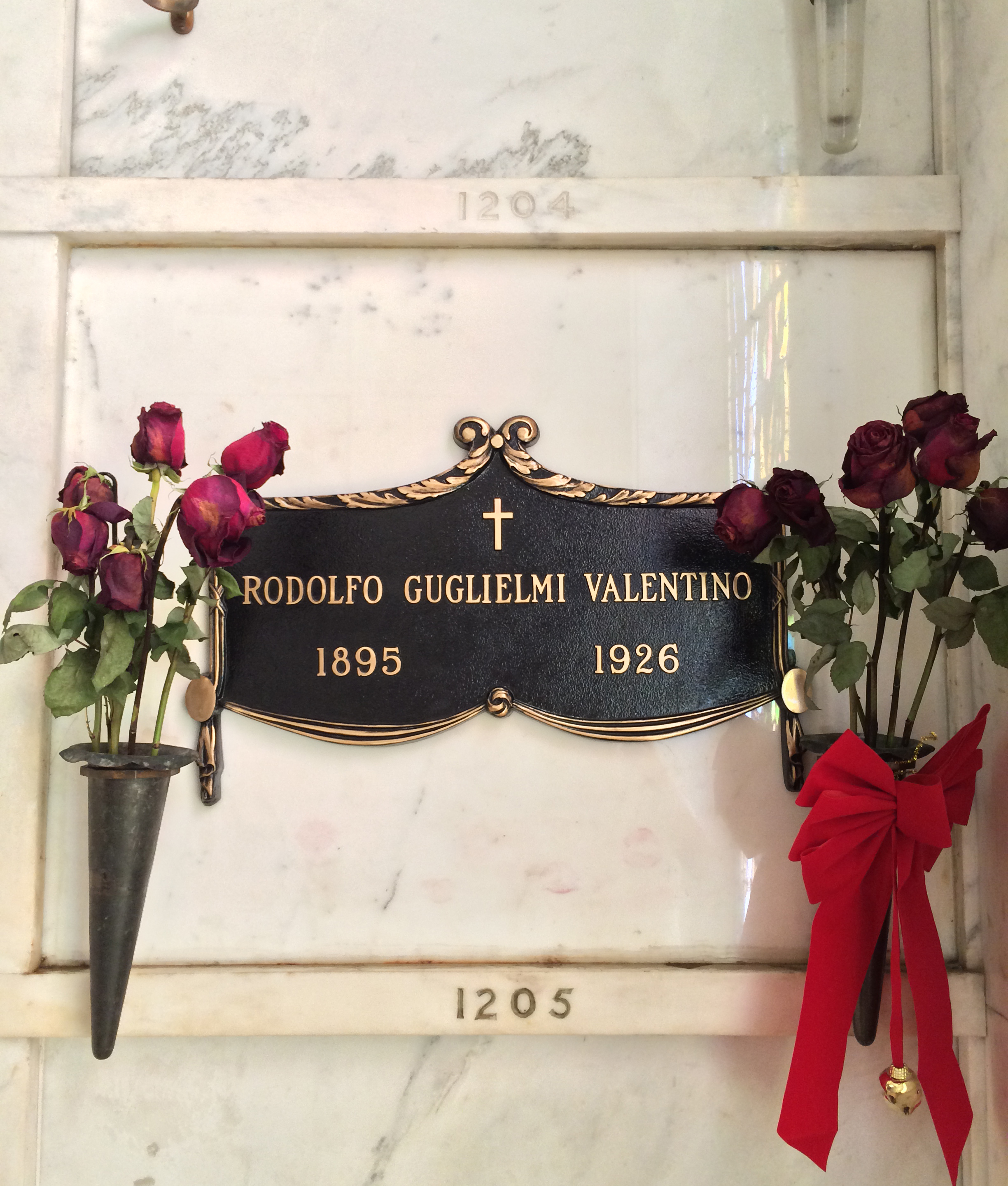
Valentino's crypt at Hollywood Forever Cemetery

Valentino's funeral Mass in Manhattan was held on August 30 at Saint Malachy's Roman Catholic Church, often called "The Actor's Chapel," as it is located on West 49th Street in the Broadway theater district, and has a long association with show-business figures.

After Valentino's remains were taken by train from New York to California, and a second funeral was held on the West Coast, at the Catholic Church of the Good Shepherd in Beverly Hills. His friend actor Charlie Chaplin was among the pallbearers.

Valentino had no final burial arrangements and his friend June Mathis arranged a temporary solution when she offered a crypt that she had purchased for herself and her husband. Coincidentally, she died the following year and was interred in the adjoining crypt that she had purchased for herself; Valentino was never moved to a new location and he remained in the crypt next to Mathis. The two are still interred side by side at Hollywood Forever Cemetery (originally Hollywood Memorial Park Cemetery) in Hollywood, California.

=== Estate ===
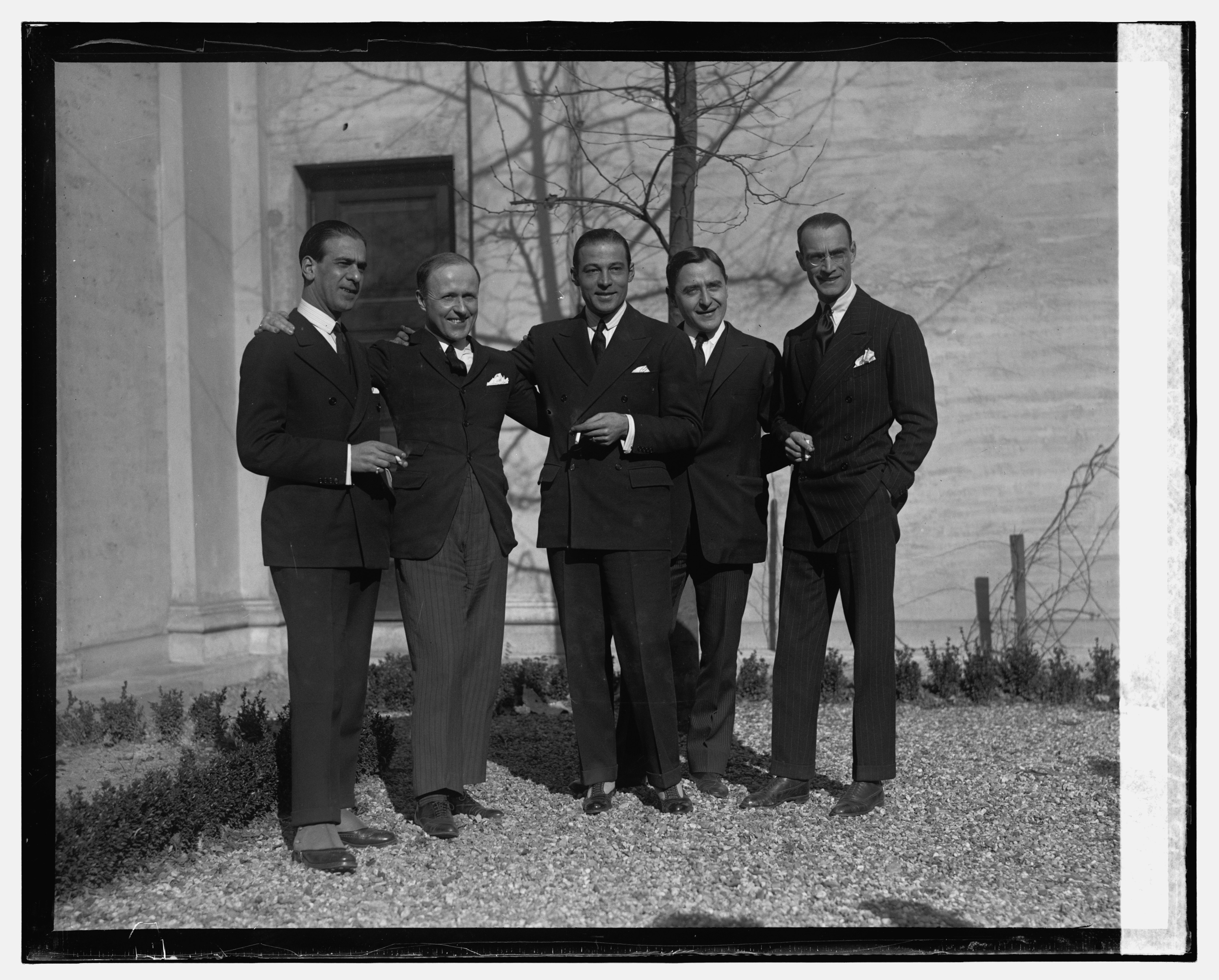
Valentino (center) and his brother Alberto Guglielmi (left) at the Italian Embassy, 1926

An extensive public auction of Valentino's personal effects took place over several days beginning on December 10, 1926, at the Hall of Art Studios in Hollywood, under the direction of his estate executor S. George Ullman and auctioneer A. H. Weil. A detailed 95-page catalog was produced listing thousands of items from the actor's wardrobe, furniture, artwork, books and curios, as well as larger assets including his automobiles and real estate. In addition to his possessions, Valentino's pet dogs and horses were also sold as part of the estate. The sales for his personal belongings reportedly drew large crowds and many lots fetched prices well above their intrinsic value, but there was little enthusiasm for his real estate holdings. His Beverly Hills home, Falcon Lair, at 2 Bella Drive and his Whitley Heights residence at 6776 Wedgewood Place failed to attract serious bidders. Although hundreds toured the Wedgewood Place property, picking flowers as souvenirs, the auction was abandoned after no offer exceeded the $10,000 mortgage, despite the estate being valued at more than $60,000 by Ullman. Falcon Lair was later owned by heiress Doris Duke, who died there in 1993. The home was later sold and underwent major renovations. The main building of the estate was razed in 2006, and the property was then put back on the market.

Valentino left his estate to his brother Alberto Guglielmi, sister Mary Guglielmi Strada, and Rambova's aunt Teresa Werner, who was left the share originally bequeathed to Rambova. Alberto Guglielmi traveled to California to oversee his estate. In 1927, he underwent facial reconstruction surgery in hopes of following in Valentino's footsteps and pursuing a career as a Hollywood actor.

In 1930, Ullman denied accusations of mismanagement brought by Valentino's siblings, asserting that the estate had been heavily in debt at the time of Valentino's death and that his administration had restored its financial stability. He resigned as executor, and his conduct was challenged in court, including claims by Valentino's nephew Jean Guglielmi that he had made improper loans from the estate. In 1934, the California District Court of Appeal decision on Valentino estate reversed a Los Angeles probate court ruling against Ullman, finding that he had managed the estate effectively. The court noted that the estate's value had increased from approximately $300,000 at Valentino's death to about $1 million under his administration.

== Legacy ==
After Valentino's death, many of his films were reissued to help pay his estate expenses. Many were reissued well into the 1930s, long after the demise of silent film. Several books were written, including one by Rambova. A photo montage print showed Valentino arriving in Heaven and being greeted by Enrico Caruso. Over the years, a "woman in black" carrying a red rose has come to mourn at Valentino's crypt, usually on the anniversary of his death. Several myths surround the woman, though it seems the first woman in black was actually a publicity stunt cooked up by press agent Russel Birdwell in 1928. A woman named Ditra Flame claimed to be the original "woman in black". Several copycats have followed over the years. Although originally a PR stunt, it has become a tradition. The current "woman in black" is motion picture historian Karie Bible. This myth of the "woman in black" was also a source of inspiration for the song "Long Black Veil."

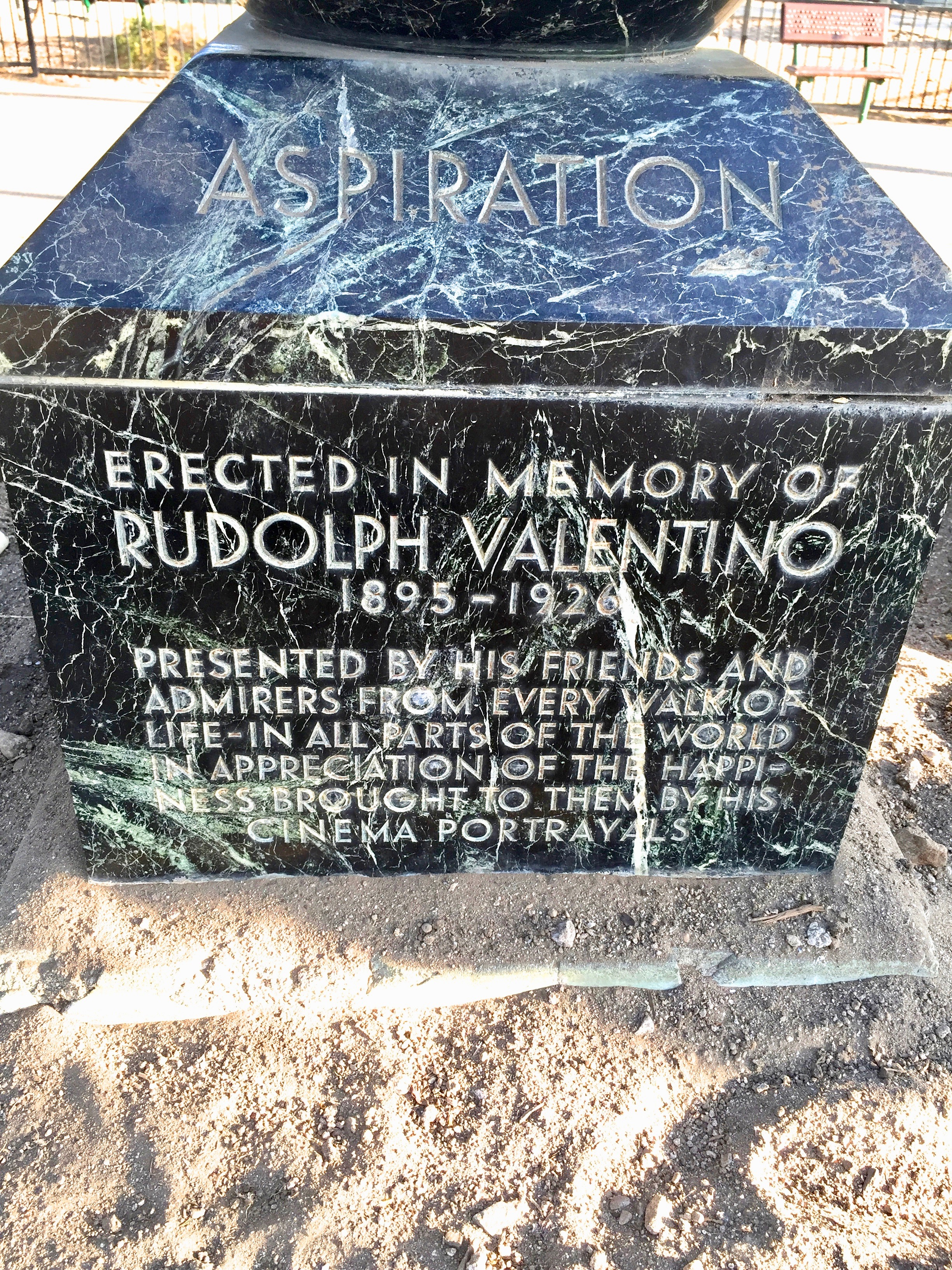
Base of the statue of Rudolph as the Sheik in De Longpre Park, Hollywood

For his contribution to the motion picture industry, Valentino received a star on the Hollywood Walk of Fame in 1960.

Valentino's hometown of Castellaneta, Italy, has created several services in his honor. A memorial designed by architect Nicola Cantore with a ceramic statue of Valentino by Luigi Gheno was unveiled in 1961. The dedication of the memorial is the subject of a vignette in the documentary Mondo Cane. During the 1995 centennial of his birth, several events were held in his honor and the Museo Rodolfo Valentino was opened. In 2009, Fondazione Rodolfo Valentino was created to promote his life and his work. That year, a film school was also opened Centro Studi Cine Club Rodolfo Valentino Castellaneta.

From 1972 to 2006, an Italian acting award—the Rudolph Valentino Award—was presented annually. Several actors from all over the world received this award, including Leonardo DiCaprio and Elizabeth Taylor.

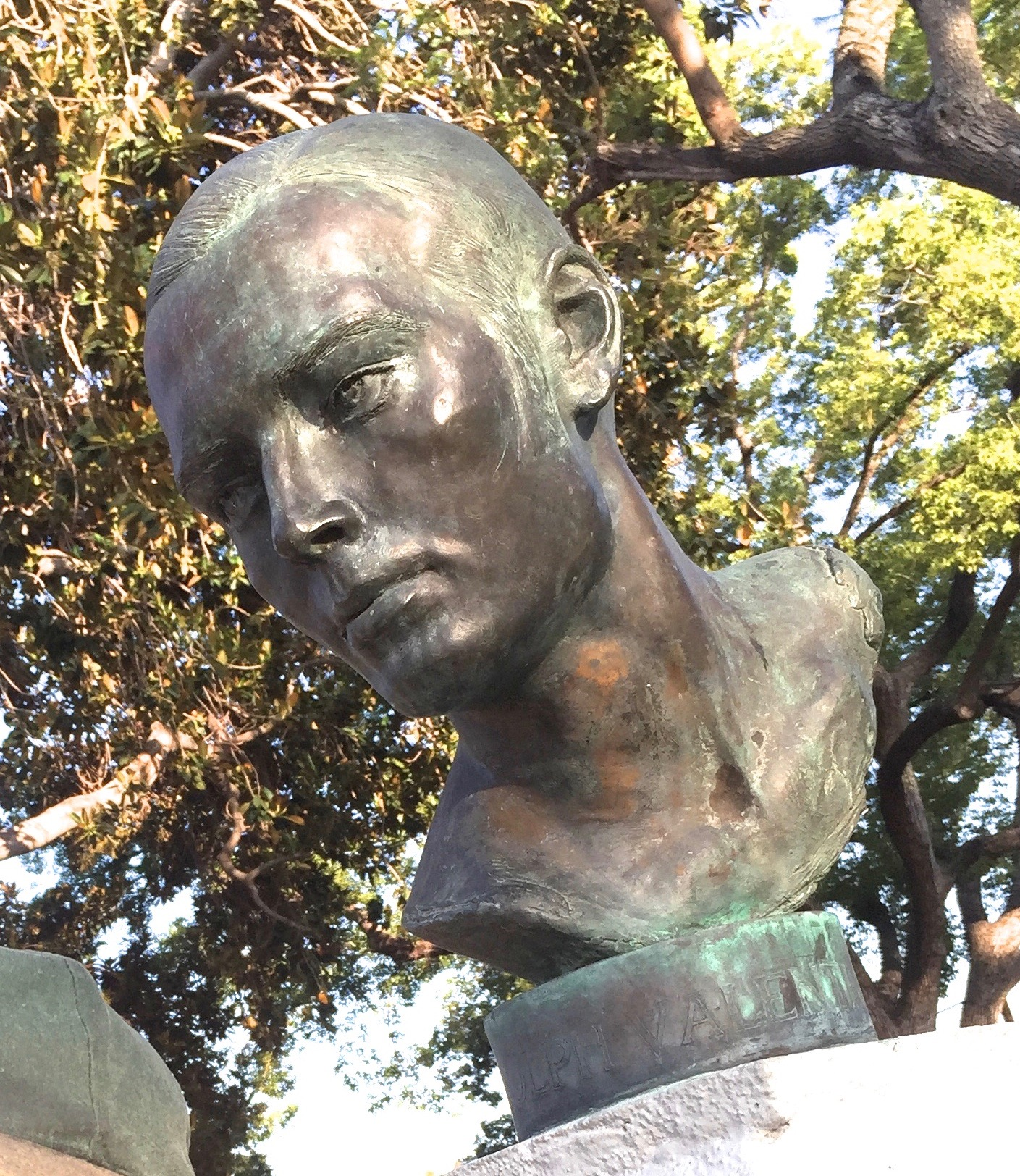
Bust of Valentino in De Longpre Park, Hollywood

In 1978, a portion of Irving Boulevard, where it meets Paramount Studios, in Hollywood, was renamed Valentino Place.

In 1994, Valentino was honored with his image on a United States postage stamp designed by caricaturist Al Hirschfeld.

In Italy in 2006, a one-off film festival was planned to celebrate the opening of the Museo Rodolfo Valentino. In May 2010, the American Society held the Rudolph Valentino Film Festival in Los Angeles, California.

Valentino's syndrome, the type of medically emergent abdominal pain that caused his death, is named after him. Hollywood High School's mascot, the Sheiks, is a tribute to a Valentino character.

Italian fashion designer Valentino Garavani was named after him.

=== Cultural depictions ===
The life of Rudolph Valentino has been filmed several times for television and cinema. A 1951 feature film about Valentino's life, called Valentino, starred Anthony Dexter in the title role. In 1975, American Broadcasting Company produced the television movie The Legend of Valentino, with Franco Nero as Valentino. In 1977, Ken Russell's film Valentino, Rudolf Nureyev portrays Valentino.

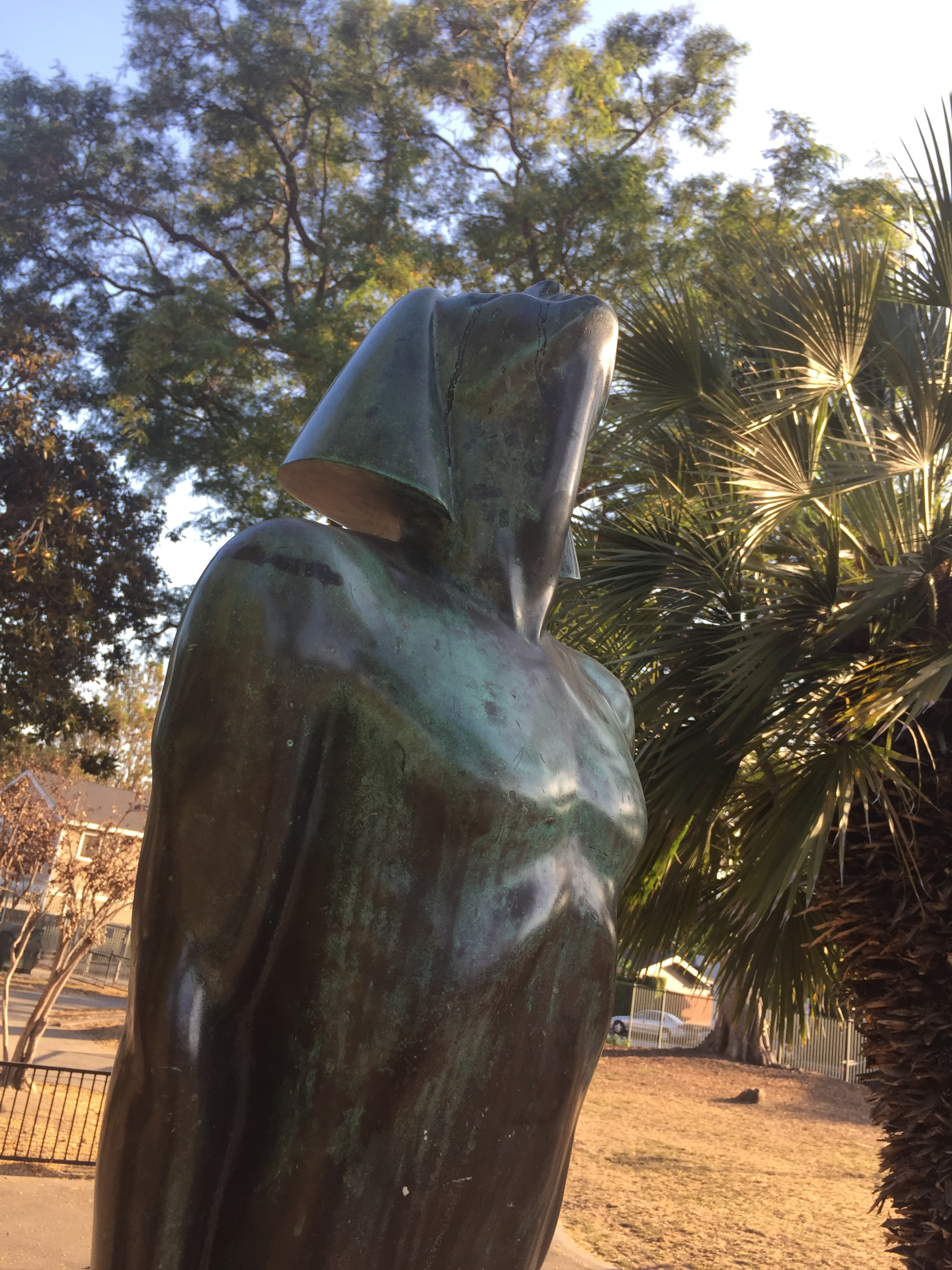
Statue of Rudolph Valentino as the Sheik in De Longpre Park, Hollywood

In the 1977 spoof comedy The World's Greatest Lover, Valentino was played by Gene Wilder.

In 1986, the French TV channel FR3 produced the television movie Série portrait, Rudolph Valentino, with Frédéric Norbert as Valentino.

In 2013, Valentino is played by actor/director Alex Monty Canawati in the motion picture Return to Babylon.

In 2015, Valentino is a supporting character in the fifth season of the horror anthology series American Horror Story. In the series, Valentino, who is played by Finn Wittrock, fakes his own death in 1926 after being transformed into a vampire. Valentino then turns his fictional lover, Elizabeth Johnson (Lady Gaga), into a vampire, as well. Elizabeth goes on to become the Countess, the central antagonist of the show's fifth season, while Valentino is eventually killed by Donovan (Matt Bomer), one of Elizabeth's many lovers, in a jealous rage.

In 2018, Vladislav Alex Kozlov had been set to play Valentino and direct an upcoming indie biopic Silent Life, with Franco Nero playing Valentino's spirit. Written by Vladislav Alex Kozlov, Ksenia Jarova, and Natalia Dar, the film stars Terry Moore, Isabella Rossellini, Franco Nero, Sherilyn Fenn, Jeff DuJardin, Paul Rodriguez, and Monte Markham. Dreamer Pictures, and Vladislav Alex Kozlov produces, and Joy Boileau, Tyler Cassity, and Yogu Kanthiah, executive produce. On February 19, 2023, Silent Life: The Story of the Lady In Black U.S. premiered at the Sedona International Film Festival.

=== Tributes in music and theater ===
Shortly after Valentino's death, several tribute songs became popular, including "There's a New Star in Heaven Tonight (Rudolph Valentino)" by Vernon Dalhart and "We Will Meet at the End of the Trail," written by his first wife, Jean Acker; both achieved bestseller status. In 1964, Freddie Hart recorded a ballad titled "Valentino."

Valentino continued to be referenced in popular music in later decades. Songs include "Valentino" (1964) by American country singer Freddie Hart; "Valentino" (1978) by Israeli singer Gali Atari; "Valentino," (1979 ) by British singer Melanie Harrold on her debut album Fancy That, released under the pseudonym Joanna Carlin; "Right Before Your Eyes" (1982) by America; "Tribute to Tino" (1982), written and performed by Dutch-Indonesian singer Taco; "Rudi" (1983) by Yugoslav singer Bebi Dol; and "Valentino," performed by Spanish band Cadillac at the 1986 Eurovision Song Contest.

In 1994, an opera by Dominick Argento (libretto by Charles Nolte) entitled The Dream of Valentino was premiered by the Washington National Opera in the District of Columbia. Reviews were not enthusiastic. The opera was revived by the Minnesota Opera in 2014, with similar reviews.

== Works ==
- Valentino, Rudolph (1923). Day Dreams. New York: MacFadden Publications.
- Valentino, Rudolph (1923). How You Can Keep Fit. New York: MacFadden Publications.
- Valentino, Rudolph (1929). My Private Diary. Occult Publishing Company.

== Sources ==
- Ellenberger, Allan R.; Ballerini, Edoardo (2005). The Valentino Mystique: The Death And Afterlife Of The Silent Film Idol. McFarland. ISBN 0-7864-1950-4.
- Leider, E. (2004). Dark Lover: The Life and Death of Rudolph Valentino. Faber & Faber. ISBN 978-0-571-21819-6.
- Morris, Michael (1991). Madam Valentino. Abbeville Press. ISBN 1-55859-136-2.
- Rambova, Natacha (1926). Rudy: An Intimate Portrait of Rudolph Valentino. London: Hutchinson & Company.
