= Colic branch of ileocolic artery =

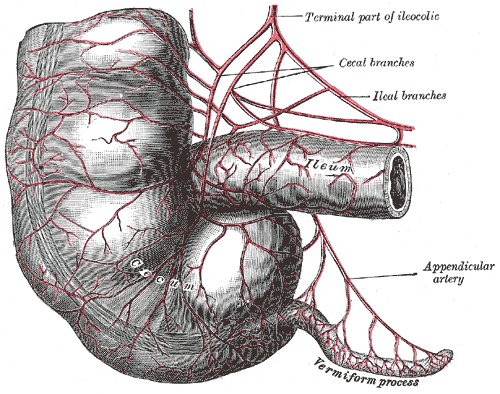
- Arteries of cecum and vermiform process.

Details
- Source: Ileocolic artery

Identifiers
- Latin: ramus colicus arteriae ileocolicae
- TA98: A12.2.12.064
- TA2: 4263
- FMA: 14820

The colic branch of ileocolic artery is a small artery in the abdomen. The ileocolic artery of the superior mesenteric artery branches off into the ascending colic artery, the anterior and posterior cecal arteries, the appendicular artery, and the ileal branches.
