= Ileocolic =

In many Animalia, including humans, an ileocolic structure or problem is something that concerns the region of the gastrointestinal tract from the ileum to the colon. In Animalia that have ceca, the ileocecal region is a subset of the ileocolic region, and the entire range can also be described as ileocecocolic, whereas in some Animalia, the ileocolic region contains no cecum, as the ileum joins the colon directly.

Things that are ileocolic, ileocecal, or both include the following:

- Ileocecal fold
- Ileocecal/ileocolic intussusception
- Ileocecal valve
- Ileocolic artery
- Ileocolic lymph nodes
- Ileocolic vein
