= Appendicular =

Appendicular can refer to:

- The vermiform appendix
- The appendicular artery, a branch of the ileocolic artery.
- The appendicular skeleton
