= Bow and arrow sign =

Gastrointestinal endoscopic landmark

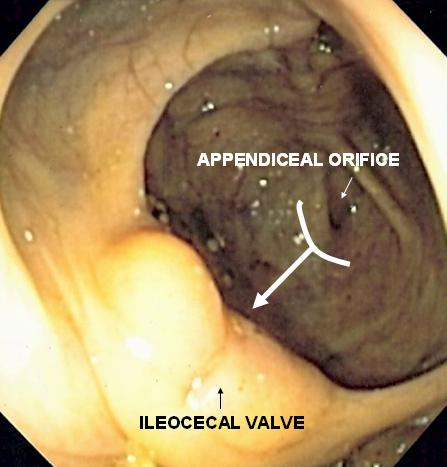
Colonscopy image of the cecum showing a bow and arrow sign. The appendiceal orifice, depicted, curves like a bow to show the location of the ileocecal valve on the most distal cecal fold.

The bow and arrow sign is an endoscopic sign for determining the location of the ileocecal valve during colonoscopy. Identifying the ileocecal valve in a colonoscopy is important, as it indicates that the entire colon has been visualized.

The identifiable landmarks in the cecum are the appendiceal orifice—which is a curvilinear indent indicating the location of the appendix from the lumen of the bowel—and the ileocecal valve, which appears as a puckering in the most distal fold of the cecum.

The bow and arrow sign uses the curve of the appendiceal orifice to point toward the direction of the ileocecal valve, as if it were a bow guiding an arrow. The colonoscope can be passed in this direction in order to enter the terminal ileum. This is used as one of two identifiable landmarks of the colon (the other being the anus), and signifies that the entire colon has been visualized.
