= Appendicular artery =

Artery supplying the appendix

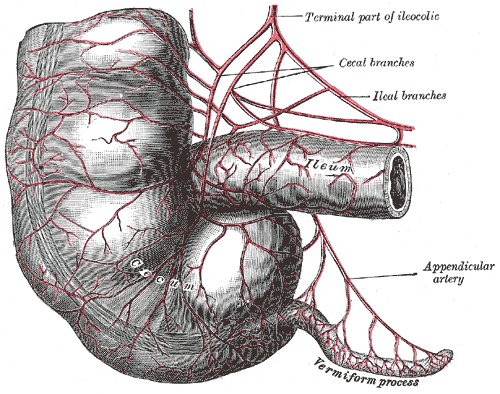
- Arteries of cecum and appendix (appendicular artery labeled at bottom center right)

Details
- Source: Ileocolic artery
- Vein: Appendicular vein
- Supplies: Appendix

Identifiers
- Latin: arteria appendicularis
- TA98: A12.2.12.062
- TA2: 4261
- FMA: 14818

The appendicular artery, also known as the appendiceal artery, commonly arises from the terminal branch of the ileocolic artery, or less commonly from the posterior cecal artery or an ileal artery. It descends behind the termination of the ileum and enters the mesoappendix of the vermiform appendix. It runs near the free margin of the mesoappendix and ends in branches which supply the appendix.

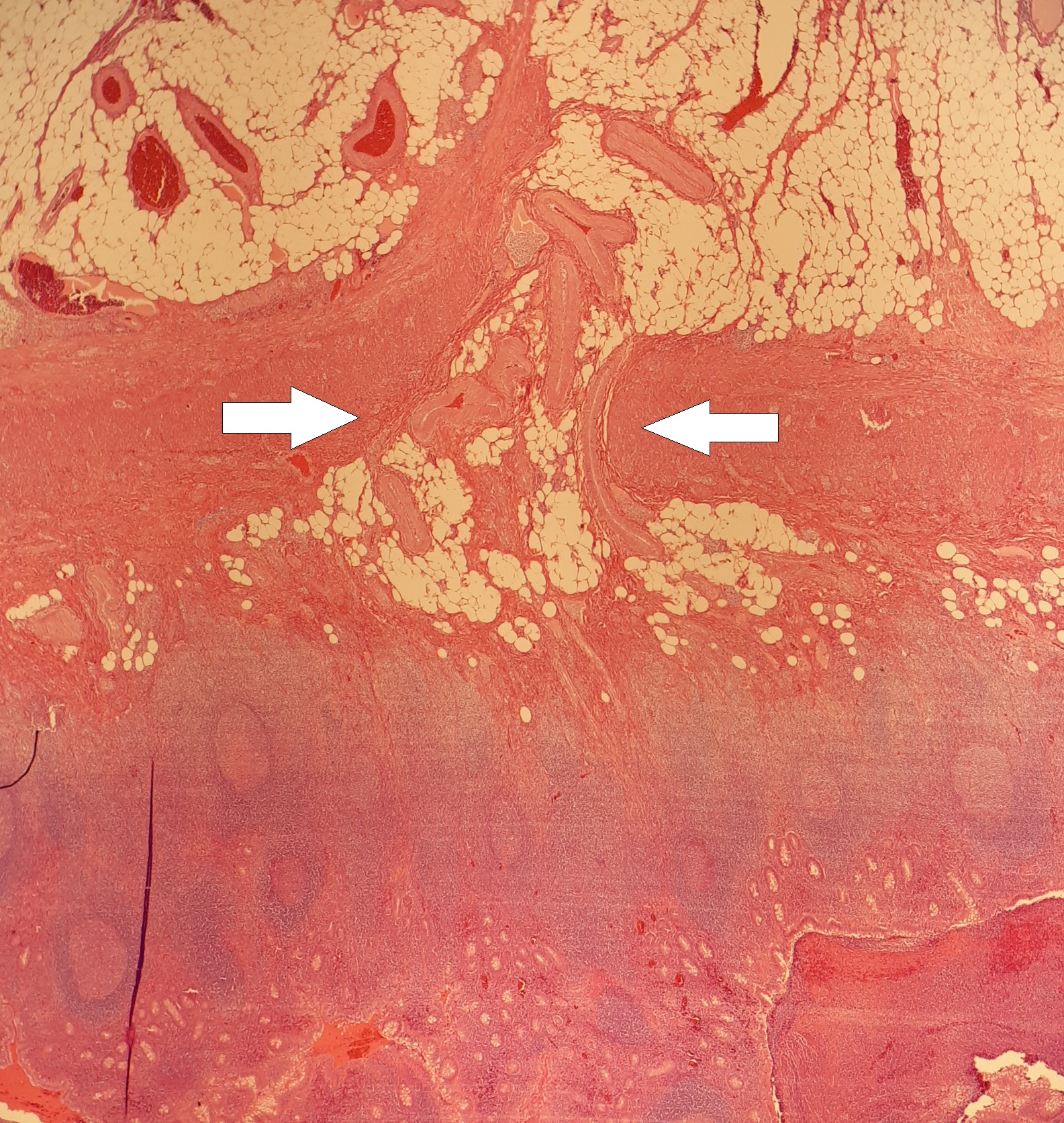
Micrograph of entry point of appendicular arteries (arrows at level of inner muscular layer), not to be confused with a perforation.
