= Right colic artery =

Artery supplying the colon

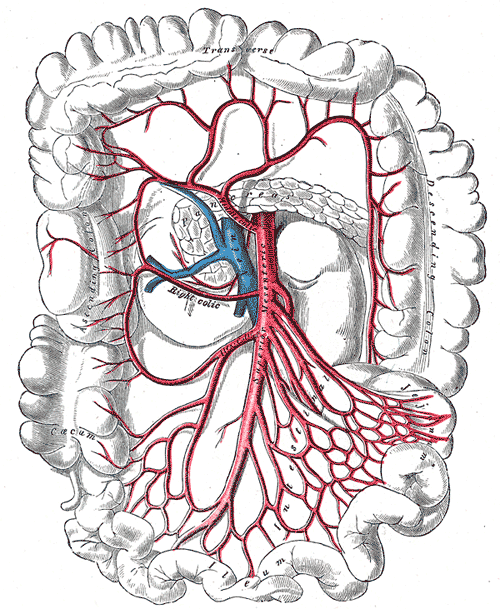
- The superior mesenteric artery and its branches. (Right colic visible at center.)

- Colonic blood supply (right colic artery is #4)

Details
- Source: Superior mesenteric artery
- Vein: Right colic vein
- Supplies: Ascending colon

Identifiers
- Latin: arteria colica dextra
- TA98: A12.2.12.065
- TA2: 4264
- FMA: 14811

The right colic artery is an artery of the abdomen, a branch of the superior mesenteric artery supplying the ascending colon. It divides into two terminal branches - an ascending branch and a descending branch - which form anastomoses with the middle colic artery, and ileocolic artery (respectively).

The right colic artery may be removed during a right hemicolectomy.

== Structure ==
The right colic artery is a relatively small and variable artery. It affords arterial supply to the ascending colon.

=== Origin ===
The right colic artery is a branch of the superior mesenteric artery. It usually arises from a common trunk with the middle colic artery, but may also arise directly from the superior mesenteric artery, or from the ileocolic artery.

=== Course ===
It passes right-ward posterior to the peritoneum, and anterior to the right gonadal vessels, the right ureter, the psoas major muscle, passing toward the middle of the ascending colon.

Sometimes, it lies at a higher level, and crosses the descending part of the duodenum and the inferior extremity of the right kidney.

At the colon, it divides into a descending branch and an ascending branch. These branches form arches, from the convexity of which vessels are distributed to the ascending colon.

=== Branches and anastomoses ===
The descending branch anastomoses with the ileocolic artery.

The ascending branch anastomoses with the middle colic artery.

=== Variation ===
The right colic artery is quite variable. It is absent in around 10% of individuals.

== Clinical significance ==
In a right hemicolectomy to remove the caecum and the ascending colon, the right colic artery is ligated and removed. Ligation is performed close to the origin of the right colic artery from the superior mesenteric artery.

If part of the superior mesenteric artery is missing due to a congenital abnormality, the right colic artery may supply part of the ileum.
