= Cecal artery =

Cecal artery, caecal artery or arteria caecalis can refer to:

- Anterior cecal artery (arteria caecalis anterior)
- Posterior cecal artery (arteria caecalis posterior)
