= Skin fold =

Cutaneous crease

Skin folds or skinfolds are areas of skin that are naturally folded. Many skin folds are distinct, heritable anatomical features, and may be used for identification of animal species, while others are non-specific and may be produced either by individual development of an organism or by arbitrary application of force to skin, either by the actions of the muscles of the body or by external force, e.g., gravity. Anatomical folds can also be found in other structures and tissues besides the skin, such as the ileocecal fold beneath the terminal ileum of the cecum.

Skin folds are of interest for cosmetology, as some kinds may be considered aesthetically undesirable, and for medicine, because some of them are susceptible to inflammation and infection.

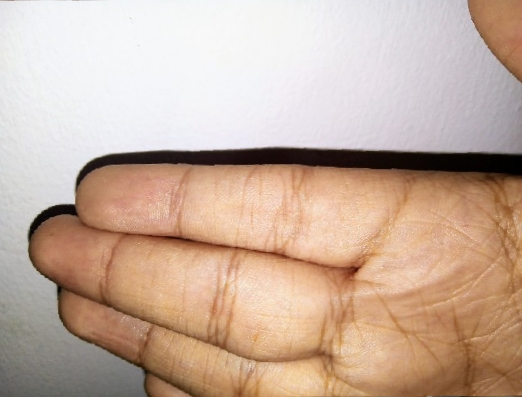
Phalangeal creases of the finger (with an extra crease in the second finger).

== Skin creases, skin folds and lines ==
The skin creases of the human body are features of great anatomical, morphological, and surgical interest and important for the maintenance of the contour of each anatomic area.

In the literature, when referring to a skin crease, there is variation of terms used other than "crease", such as "fold" and "sulcus", but these terms do not accurately reflect their histology structure nor their function. In the review of literature, a record of the creases of the human body for each anatomic area, including the synonyms that are used for each crease in the literature, has been attempted.

The skin crease as a fixed and permanent line, according to their histology, is related to connective tissue attachments with the underlying structures or extensions of the underlying muscle fibers in the dermis of the crease site.

The skin fold is characterized by skin redundancy that is responsible partly, often in combination with connective tissue attachments, for the skin crease. It is essential to use appropriate terms that accurately reflect the anatomic structure and histology when referring to the skin lines.

== Human skin folds ==
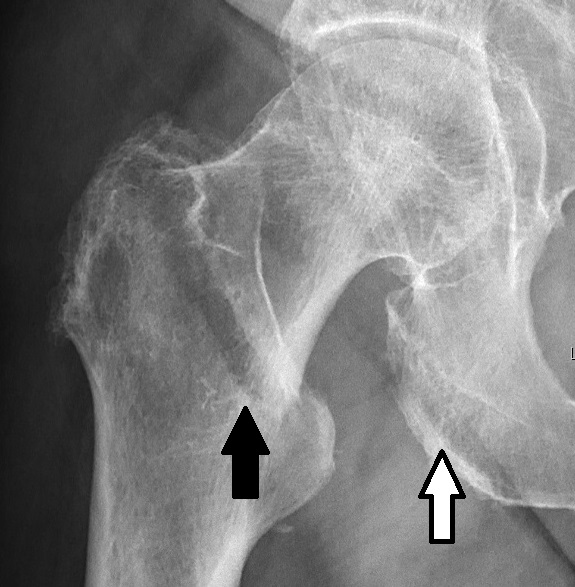
In projectional radiography, skin folds may mimic fractures: In this case a hip fracture (black arrow) next to a skin fold (white arrow).

The following distinct skin fold types are among the roughly 100 identified in human anatomy:

- Nasolabial fold
- Epicanthal fold
- Interdigital folds (Plica Interdigitalis)
- Inframammary fold
- Triceps skinfold
- Webbed neck

== See also ==
- Wrinkle
- Skin line
- Pannus
- Dimple
- Intertrigo
- Irritant diaper dermatitis
- Inverse psoriasis
