= Retrograde appendicectomy =

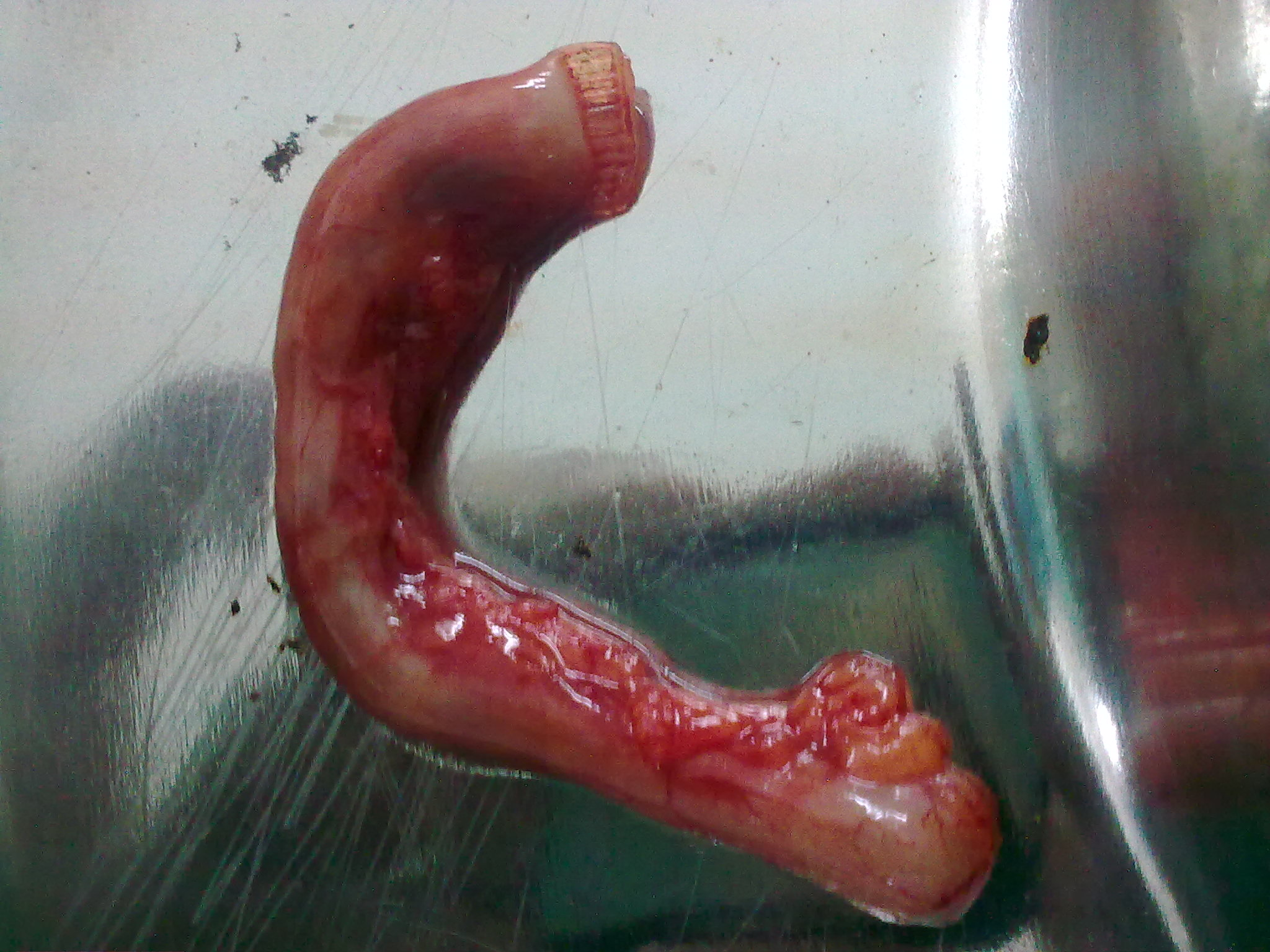

A retrograde appendicectomy is a form of surgery to remove an appendix that is retrocaecal and adherent or otherwise inaccessible, so that the appendicectomy is performed in a retrograde fashion. In cases of acute appendicitis, antegrade appendicectomy is the preferred option, but in cases where the base of the appendix is accessible but is difficult to identify or deliver its more distal portion, a retrograde appendicectomy becomes necessary.

== Technique ==
Firstly, the base is divided between artery forceps then the appendiceal vessels are then ligated, the stump ligated and invaginated, and gentle traction on the caecum will enable the surgeon to deliver the body of the appendix, which is then removed from base to tip.
