= Ileocolic vein =

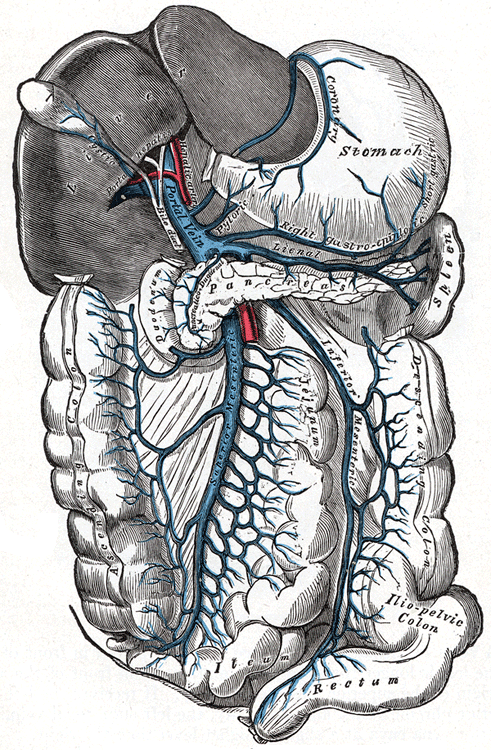
- The portal vein and its tributaries.

Details
- Source: Appendicular vein
- Drains to: Superior mesenteric vein
- Artery: Ileocolic artery

Identifiers
- Latin: vena ileocolica
- TA98: A12.3.12.024
- TA2: 5119
- FMA: 15408

The ileocolic vein is a vein which drains the ileum, colon, appendix and cecum. It originates from the Ileocolic artery. The appendicular and the cecal veins merge together and create the ileocolic vein. It drains into the superior mesenteric vein, which later enters the hepatic portal vein.
