= Neutropenic enterocolitis =

- Other names: Typhlitis, typhlenteritis, caecitis, cecitis
- Specialty: General surgery

Neutropenic enterocolitis, also known as typhlitis, is an inflammation of the cecum (part of the large intestine) that may be associated with infection. It is particularly associated with neutropenia, a low level of neutrophil granulocytes (the most common form of white blood cells) in the blood.

Typhlitis is a kind of neutropenic enterocolitis. Typhlitis is neutropenic enterocolitis of the ileocecal region, but neutropenic enterocolitis can include other parts of the small intestine and large intestine.

== Signs and symptoms ==
Signs and symptoms of typhlitis may include diarrhea, a distended abdomen, fever, chills, nausea, vomiting, and abdominal pain or tenderness.

== Cause ==
The condition is usually caused by Gram-positive enteric commensal bacteria of the gut (gut flora). Clostridioides difficile is a species of Gram-positive bacteria that commonly causes severe diarrhea and other intestinal diseases when competing bacteria are wiped out by antibiotics, causing pseudomembranous colitis, whereas Clostridium septicum is responsible for most cases of neutropenic enterocolitis.

Typhlitis most commonly occurs in immunocompromised patients, such as those undergoing chemotherapy, patients with AIDS, kidney transplant patients, or the elderly.

== Diagnosis ==
Typhlitis is diagnosed with a radiograph CT scan showing thickening of the cecum and "fat stranding".

== Treatment ==
Typhlitis is a medical emergency and requires prompt management. Untreated typhlitis has a poor prognosis, particularly if associated with pneumatosis intestinalis (air in the bowel wall) and/or bowel perforation, and has significant morbidity unless promptly recognized and aggressively treated.

Successful treatment hinges on:

1. Early diagnosis provided by a high index of suspicion and the use of CT scanning
2. Nonoperative treatment for uncomplicated cases
3. Empiric antibiotics, particularly if the patient is neutropenic or at other risk of infection.

In rare cases of prolonged neutropenia and complications such as bowel perforation, neutrophil transfusions can be considered but have not been studied in a randomized control trial. Elective right hemicolectomy may be used to prevent recurrence but is generally not recommended.

"...The authors have found nonoperative treatment highly effective in patients who do not manifest signs of peritonitis, perforation, gastrointestinal hemorrhage, or clinical deterioration. Recurrent typhlitis was frequent after conservative therapy (recurrence rate, 67 percent), however," as based on studies from the 1980s.

== Prognosis ==
Inflammation can spread to other parts of the gut in patients with typhlitis. The condition can also cause the cecum to become distended and can cut off its blood supply. This and other factors can result in necrosis and perforation of the bowel, which can cause peritonitis and sepsis.

Historically, the mortality rate for typhlitis was as high as 50%, mostly because it is frequently associated with bowel perforation. More recent studies have demonstrated better outcomes with prompt medical management, generally with resolution of symptoms with neutrophil recovery without death .

== See also ==
- Colitis
