= Ileocecal fold =

Anatomical structure of the human abdomen

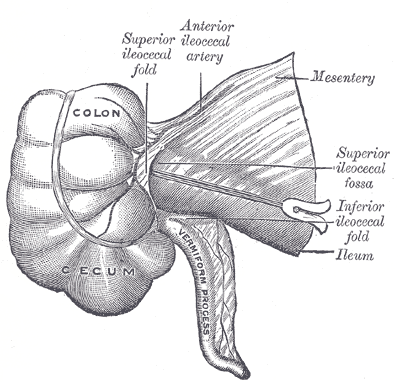
- Superior ileocecal fossa

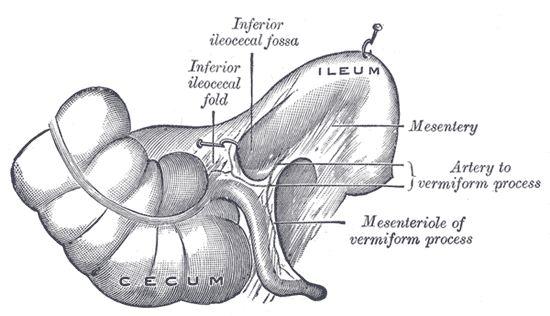
- Inferior ileocecal fossa

Details

Identifiers
- Latin: plica ileocaecalis
- TA98: A10.1.02.421
- TA2: 3788
- FMA: 16532

The ileocecal fold (or ileocaecal fold) is an anatomical structure of the human abdomen formed by a layer of peritoneum between the ileum and cecum. The upper border of the ileocecal fold is fixed to the ileum opposite its mesenteric attachment, and the lower border passes over the ileocecal junction to join the mesentery of the appendix (and sometimes the appendix itself as well). Behind the ileocecal fold is the inferior ileocecal fossa.

The ileocecal fold is also called a ligament, veil, or bloodless fold of Treves (after English surgeon Sir Frederick Treves). Despite the latter name, the ileocecal fold in fact often contains a vessel.

== Additional images ==
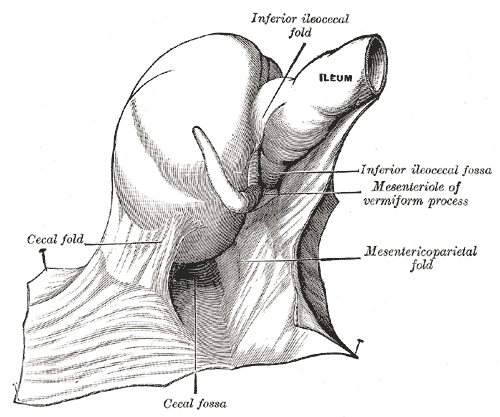
The cecal fossa. The ileum and cecum are drawn backward and upward.
