= Ileal branch of ileocolic artery =

Component of human cardiovasculature

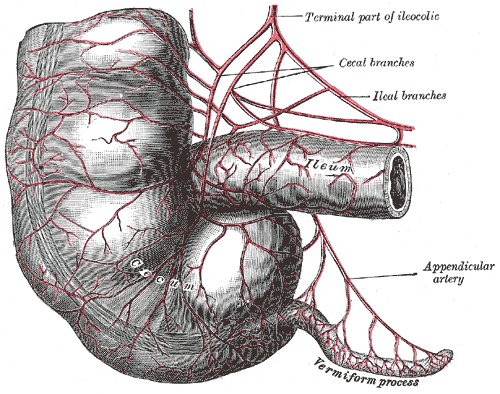
- Arteries of cecum and vermiform process.

Details
- Source: Ileocolic artery

Identifiers
- Latin: rami ilealis arteriae ileocolicae
- TA98: A12.2.12.063
- TA2: 4262
- FMA: 14819

The ileal branch of ileocolic artery is a branch of the ileocolic artery. The ileal branch of ileocolic artery arises from the inferior branch of the ileocolic artery and forms an anastomosis with the last intestinal artery.
