= Joseph von Gerlach =

German professor of anatomy

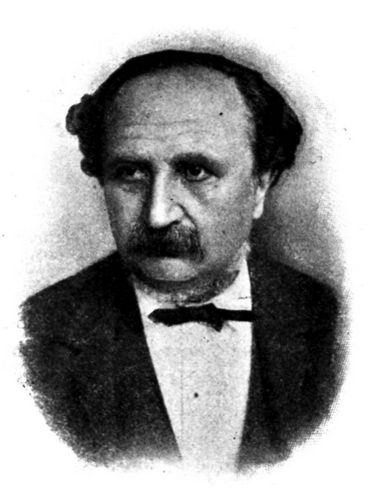
Joseph von Gerlach (1820-1896)

Joseph von Gerlach (3 April 1820 – 17 December 1896) was a German professor of anatomy at the University of Erlangen. He was a native of Mainz, Rhineland-Palatinate. Gerlach was a pioneer of histological staining and anatomical micrography. In 1858, Gerlach introduced carmine mixed with gelatin as a histological stain.

Along with Camillo Golgi, he was a major proponent of the reticular theory that the brain's nervous system consisted of processes of contiguous cells fused to create a massive meshed network. Gerlach summed up his theory by stating:

the finest divisions of the protoplasmic processes ultimately take part in the formation of the fine nerve fibre network which I consider to be an essential constituent of the gray matter of the spinal cord. The divisions are none other than the beginnings of this nerve fibre net. The cells of the gray matter are therefore doubly connected by means of the nerve process which becomes the axis fibre and through the finest branches of the protoplasmic processes which become a part of the fine nerve fibre net of the gray matter.

The reticular theory predominated until the 1890s when Ramon y Cajal brought forth his neuron doctrine of synaptic junctions, which in essence replaced the reticular theory.

Gerlach was one of the first physicians to use photomicrography for medical research. In 1863, he published a handbook titled Die Photographie als Hilfsmittel mikroskopischer Forschung (Engl. "Photography as a tool in microscopic science") in which he discusses the practical and technological aspects of microscopic photography.

The eponymous "Gerlach's valve" (valvula processus vermiformis) is named after him. This anatomical structure is a fold of membrane sometimes found at the opening of the vermiform appendix. In his article Ueber das Hautathmen (Engl. "On skin respiration") he was the first to show that human skin uses oxygen from ambient air.
