= Appendicular vein =

Details
- Drains from: Vermiform appendix
- Drains to: Ileocolic vein
- Artery: Appendicular artery

Identifiers
- Latin: vena appendicularis
- TA98: A12.3.12.025
- TA2: 5120
- FMA: 15410

The appendicular vein is the vein which drains blood from the vermiform appendix. It is located in the mesoappendix and accompanies the appendicular artery. The appendicular vein drains into the ileocolic vein.
