= Ileal veins =

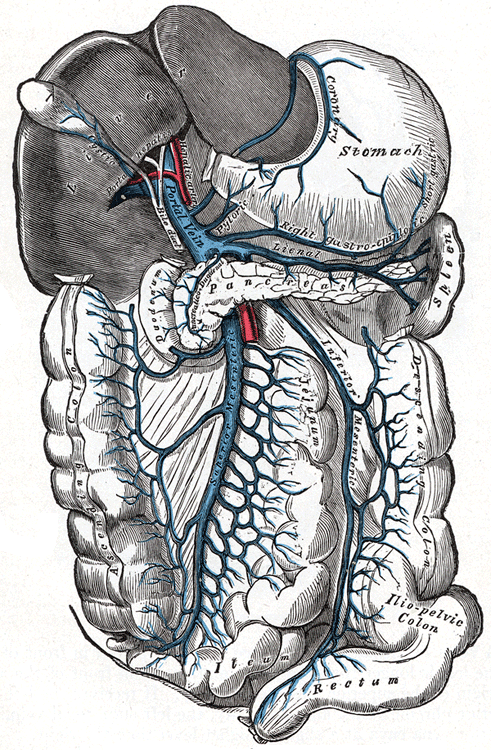
- The portal vein and its tributaries.

Details
- Drains from: Ileum
- Drains to: Superior mesenteric vein
- Artery: Ileal arteries

Identifiers
- Latin: venae ileales
- TA98: A12.3.12.020
- TA2: 5115
- FMA: 70928

The ileal veins are tributaries of the superior mesenteric vein.
