= Right colic vein =

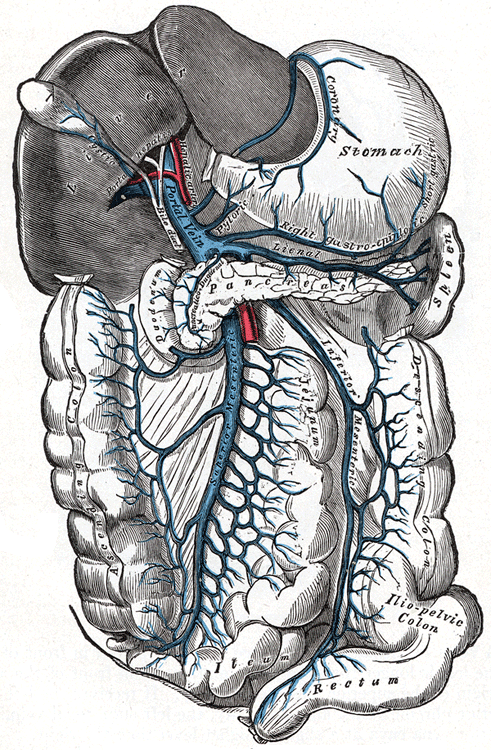
- The portal vein and its tributaries.

Details
- Drains from: Ascending colon
- Drains to: Superior mesenteric vein
- Artery: Right colic artery

Identifiers
- Latin: vena colica dextra
- TA98: A12.3.12.026
- TA2: 5121
- FMA: 15407

The right colic vein drains the ascending colon, and is a tributary of the superior mesenteric vein. It travels with its corresponding artery, the right colic artery.

== Background ==
This study was designed to describe the precise anatomic venous tributaries of the superior mesenteric vein with special emphasis on the superior right colic vein (SRCV), which is seldom mentioned in the literature.

== Methods ==
Nine adult cadavers were dissected to define the venous tributaries of the superior mesenteric vein. The SRCV, middle colic vein, and right colic vein (RCV) were defined as those that drained from the marginal vein of the right flexure of the colon, the transverse colon, and the ascending colon, respectively.

== Results ==
The SRCV was observed to drain from the right flexure of the colon to the confluence of the right gastroepiploic and superior pancreaticoduodenal veins and present the gastrocolic trunk of Henle (GTH) in 8 of 9 cases. The RCV terminated into the GTH in 4 cases. The SRCV, the RCV, and the middle colic vein formed a confluence and entered into the GTH in 1 case.

== Conclusions ==
The SRCV exits and drains from the right colonic flexure to the GTH in 89% of cases.
