= Anterior cecal artery =

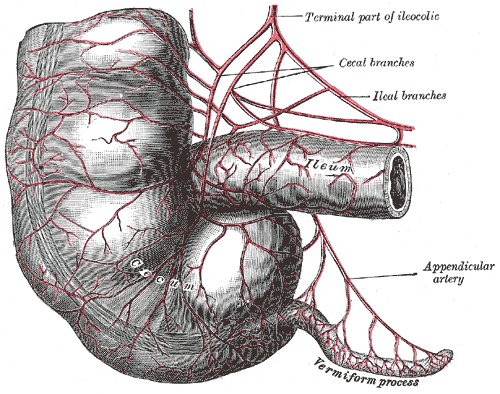
- Arteries of cecum and appendix

Details
- Source: Ileocolic artery

Identifiers
- Latin: arteria caecalis anterior
- TA98: A12.2.12.060
- TA2: 4259
- FMA: 14816

The anterior cecal artery (or anterior caecal artery) is a branch of the ileocolic artery which supplies the anterior region of the cecum.
