= Ileocolic artery =

Artery in the abdomen

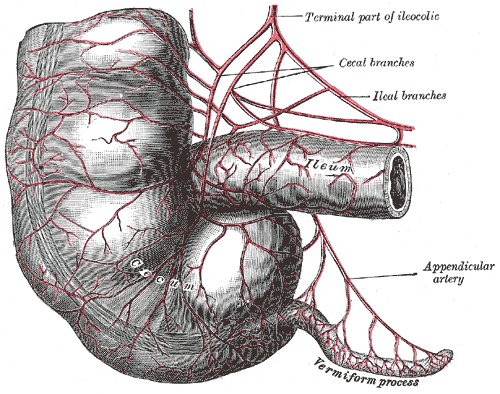
- Arteries of cecum and vermiform process. (Terminal part of Ileocolic labeled at upper right.)

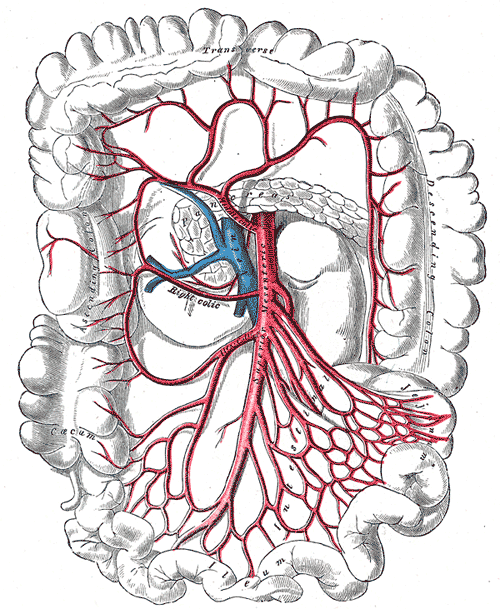
- The superior mesenteric artery and its branches. (Ileocolic artery not labeled, but visible at bottom left.)

Details
- Source: Superior mesenteric artery
- Branches: Appendicular artery anterior cecal artery posterior cecal artery
- Vein: Ileocolic vein

Identifiers
- Latin: arteria ileocolica
- TA98: A12.2.12.059
- TA2: 4258
- FMA: 14815

The ileocolic artery is the lowest branch arising from the concavity of the superior mesenteric artery. It supplies the cecum, ileum, and appendix.

It passes downward and to the right behind the peritoneum toward the right iliac fossa, where it divides into a superior and an inferior branch: the inferior gives rise to the appendicular artery and anastomoses with the end of the superior mesenteric artery; the superior branch anastomoses with the right colic artery.

== Anatomy ==
=== Branches ===
The inferior branch of the ileocolic runs toward the upper border of the ileocolic junction and produces the following branches:

- colic branch of ileocolic artery, which passes upward on the ascending colon - from the posterior branch of the inferior branch of the ileocolic artery
- ileocecal (some sources acknowledge this division while others do not)
  - anterior cecal artery and posterior cecal artery, which are distributed to the front and back of the cecum
  - ileal branch of ileocolic artery, which runs upward and to the left on the lower part of the ileum and anastomoses with the termination of the superior mesenteric artery
  - an appendicular artery

== Additional images ==
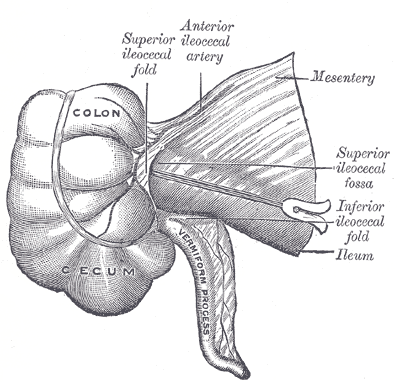
Superior ileocecal fossa.

Colonic blood supply
