= Ileocecal valve =

Sphincter muscle valve

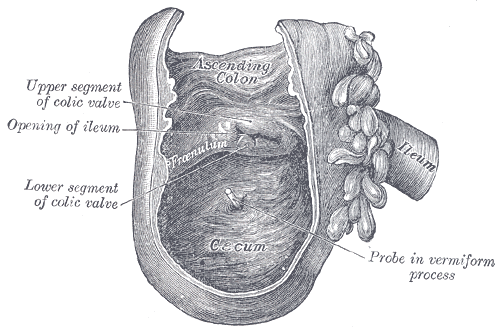
- Interior of the cecum and lower end of ascending colon with the ileocecal valve labeled as "colic valve"

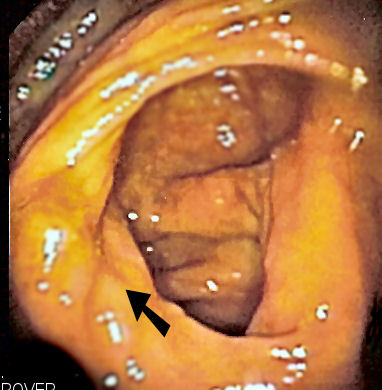
- Endoscopic image of cecum with arrow pointing to ileocecal valve in foreground

Details
- System: Digestive system
- Location: Junction between ileum and cecum
- Artery: Ileocolic artery
- Vein: Ileocolic vein
- Function: Muscular sphincter

Identifiers
- Latin: valva ileocaecalis s. papilla ilealis
- MeSH: D007080
- FMA: 15973

The ileocecal valve (Note: Also referred as ileal papilla, ileocaecal valve, Tulp's valve, Tulpius valve, Bauhin's valve, ileocecal eminence, valve of Varolius or colic valve.) is a sphincter muscle valve that separates the small intestine and the large intestine. Its critical function is to limit the reflux of colonic contents into the ileum. Approximately two liters of fluid enters the colon daily through the ileocecal valve.

== Microanatomy ==
The histology of the ileocecal valve shows an abrupt change from a villous mucosa pattern of the ileum to a more colonic mucosa. A thickening of the muscularis mucosa, which is the smooth muscle tissue found beneath the mucosal layer of the digestive tract. A thickening of the muscularis externa is also noted.

There is also a variable amount of lymphatic tissue found at the valve.

The ileocecal valve has a papillose structure.

== Clinical significance ==
=== Colonoscopy ===
During colonoscopy, the ileocecal valve is used, along with the appendiceal orifice, in the identification of the cecum. This is important as it indicates that a complete colonoscopy has been performed. The ileocecal valve is typically located on the last fold before entry into the cecum and can be located from the direction of curvature of the appendiceal orifice, in what is known as the bow and arrow sign.

Intubation of the ileocecal valve is typically performed in colonoscopy to evaluate the distal, or lowest, part of the ileum. Small bowel endoscopy can also be performed by double-balloon enteroscopy through intubation of the ileocecal valve.

=== Lesions ===
Tumors of the ileocecal valve are rare, but have been reported in the literature. Other benign lesions may also occur on the ileocecal valve, which are often hard to diagnose and treat surgically.

== History ==
The ileocecal valve was described by the Dutch physician Nicolaes Tulp (1593–1674), and thus it is sometimes known as Tulp's valve.

The ileocecal valve was also described in 1588 by Gaspard Bauhin—hence the name Bauhin's Valve or Valve of Bauhin—in the preface of his first writing, De corporis humani partibus externis tractatus, hactenus non editus.

== Additional images ==
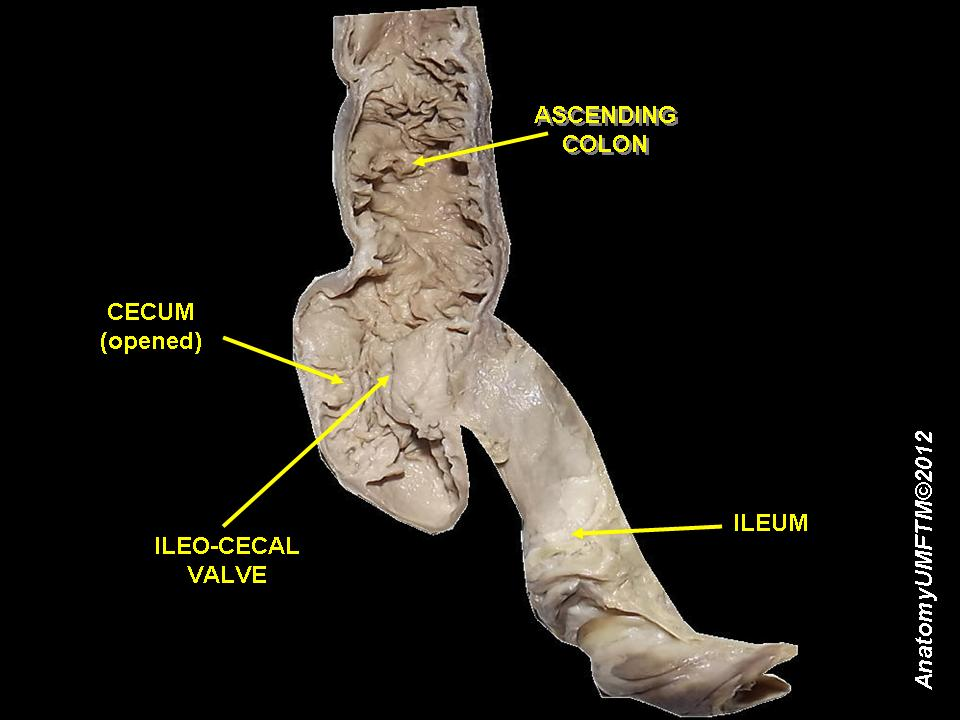
Ileum, cecum and ascending colon

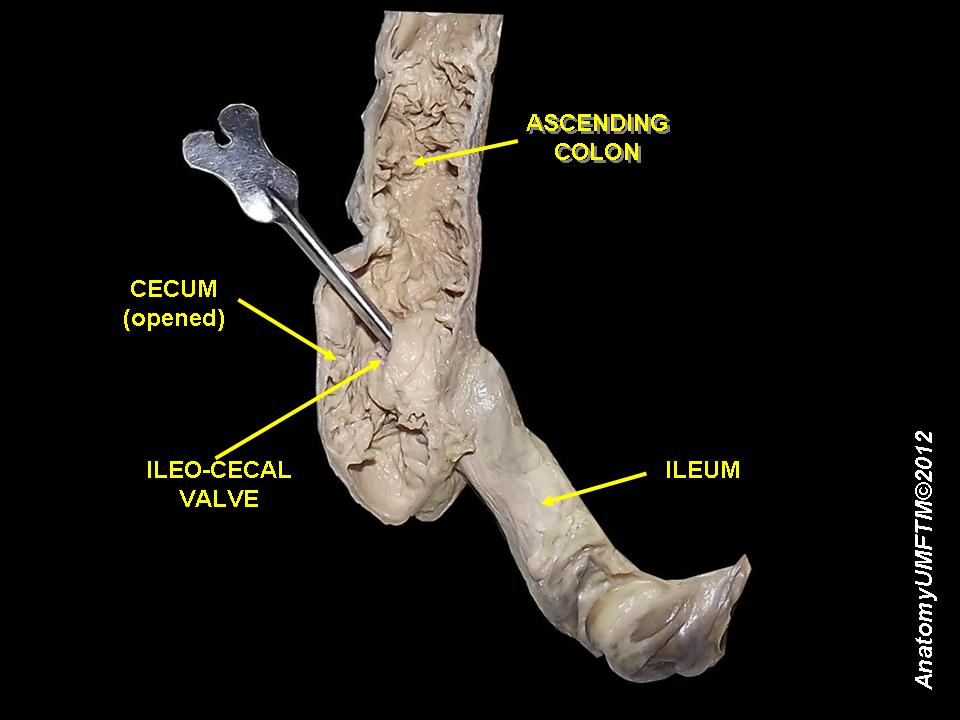
Cecum and ileum

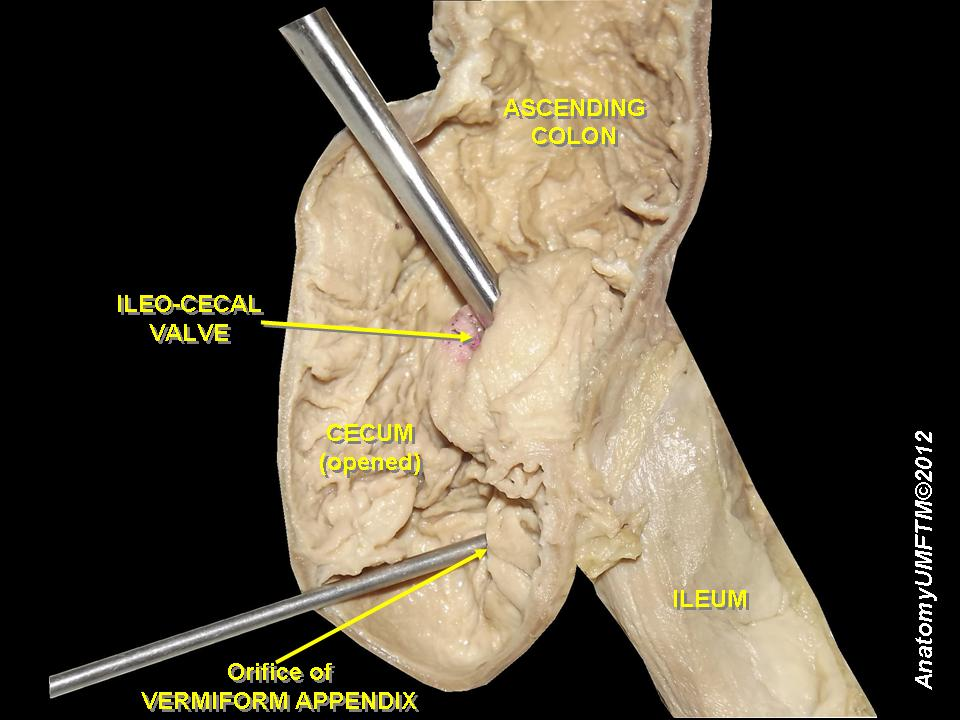
Ileo-cecal valve

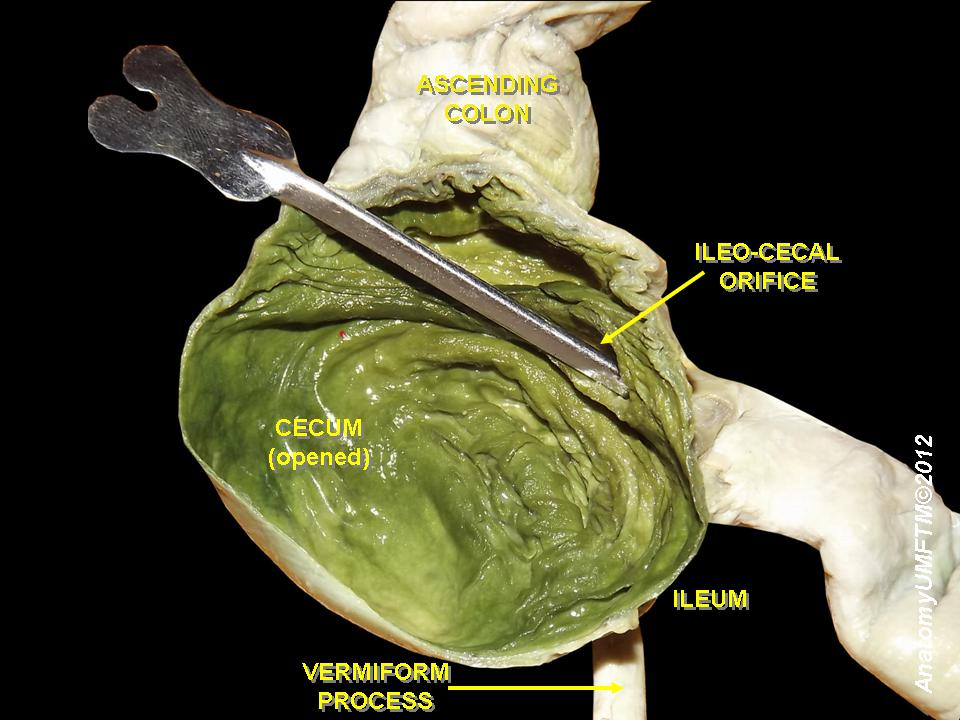
Ileo-cecal valve
