= Ileal arteries =

Group of arteries that provide blood to the ileum

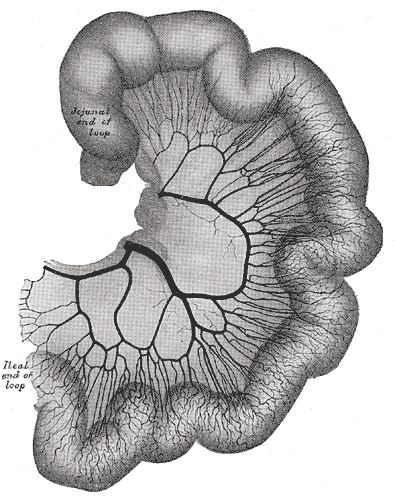
- Loop of small intestine showing distribution of intestinal arteries.

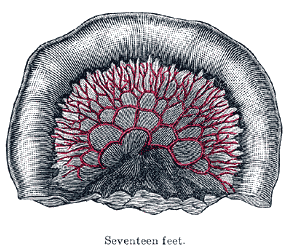
- Ileal arteries

Details
- Source: Superior mesenteric artery
- Branches: Straight arteries of ileum
- Vein: Ileal veins
- Supplies: Ileum

Identifiers
- Latin: arteriae ileales
- TA98: A12.2.12.058
- TA2: 4257
- FMA: 70810

The ileal arteries are 12 branches of the superior mesenteric artery which supply blood to the ileum. They arise from the left side of the superior mesenteric artery.
