= Posterior cecal artery =

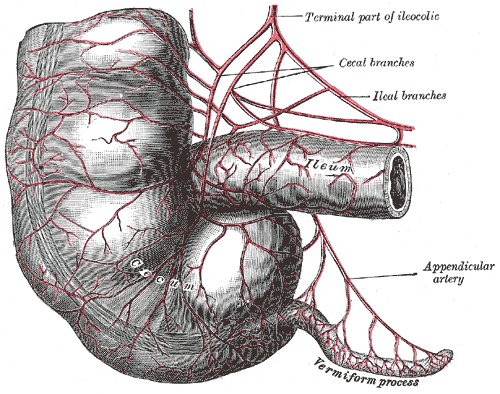
- Arteries of cecum and vermiform process.

Details
- Source: Ileocolic artery

Identifiers
- Latin: arteria caecalis posterior
- TA98: A12.2.12.061
- TA2: 4260
- FMA: 14817

The posterior cecal artery (or posterior caecal artery) is a branch of the ileocolic artery.
