= Ileum =

Final section of the small intestine

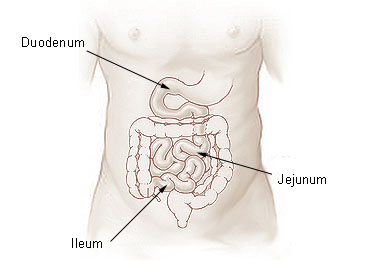
- Small intestine

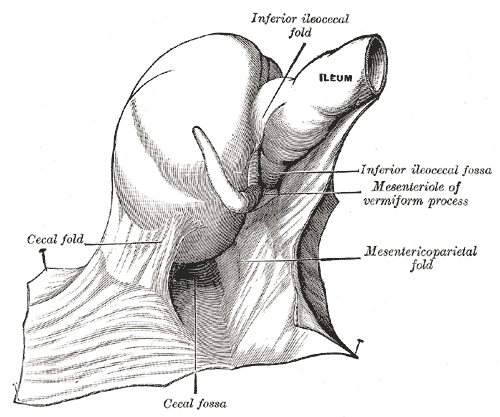
- The cecal fossa. The ileum and cecum are drawn backward and upward.

Details
- Precursor: Midgut
- Artery: Ileal arteries, ileocolic artery
- Vein: Ileal veins
- Nerve: Celiac ganglia, vagus

Identifiers
- Latin: ileum
- MeSH: D007082
- TA98: A05.6.04.001
- TA2: 2959
- FMA: 7208

The ileum (/ˈɪliəm/) is the final section of the small intestine in most higher vertebrates, including mammals, reptiles, and birds. In fish, the divisions of the small intestine are not as clear and the terms posterior intestine or distal intestine may be used instead of ileum. Its main function is to absorb vitamin B_{12}, bile salts, and whatever products of digestion that were not absorbed by the jejunum.

The ileum follows the duodenum and jejunum and is separated from the cecum by the ileocecal valve (ICV). In humans, the ileum is about 2–4 m long, and the pH is usually between 7 and 8 (neutral or slightly basic).

Ileum is derived from the Greek word εἰλεός (eileós), referring to a medical condition known as ileus.

== Structure ==
The ileum is the third and final part of the small intestine. It follows the jejunum and ends at the ileocecal junction, where the terminal ileum communicates with the cecum of the large intestine through the ileocecal valve. The ileum, along with the jejunum, is suspended inside the mesentery, a peritoneal formation that carries the blood vessels supplying them (the superior mesenteric artery and vein), lymphatic vessels and nerve fibers.

There is no line of demarcation between the jejunum and the ileum. There are, however, subtle differences between the two:

- The ileum has more fat inside the mesentery than the jejunum.
- The diameter of its lumen is smaller and has thinner walls than the jejunum.
- Its circular folds are smaller and absent in the terminal part of the ileum.
- While the length of the intestinal tract contains lymphoid tissue, only the ileum has abundant Peyer's patches, unencapsulated lymphoid nodules that contain large numbers of lymphocytes and other cells of the immune system.

=== Histology ===
The four layers that make up the wall of the ileum are consistent with those of the gastrointestinal tract. From the inner to the outer surface, these are:

- A mucous membrane, itself formed by three different layers:
  - A single layer of tall cells that line the lumen of the organ. The epithelium that forms the innermost part of the mucosa has five distinct types of cells that serve different purposes: enterocytes with microvilli, which digest and absorb nutrients; goblet cells, which secrete mucin, a substance that lubricates the wall of the organ; Paneth cells, most common in the terminal part of the ileum, are only found at the bottom of the intestinal glands and release antimicrobial substances such as alpha defensins and lysozyme; microfold cells, which take up and transport antigens from the lumen to lymphatic cells of the lamina propria; and enteroendocrine cells, which secrete hormones.
  - An underlying lamina propria composed of loose connective tissue and containing germinal centers and large aggregates of lymphoid tissue called Peyer's patches, which are a distinctive feature of the ileum.
  - A thin layer of smooth muscle called muscularis mucosae
- A submucosa formed by dense irregular connective tissue that carries the larger blood vessels and a nervous component called submucosal plexus, which is part of the enteric nervous system
- An external muscular layer formed by two layers of smooth muscle arranged in circular bundles in the inner layer and in longitudinal bundles in the outer layer. Between the two layers is the myenteric plexus, formed by nervous tissue and also a part of the enteric nervous system.
- A serosa composed of mesothelium, a single layer of flat cells with varying quantities of underlying connective and adipose tissue. This layer represents the visceral peritoneum and is continuous with the mesentery.
General structure of the gut wall. Brunner's glands are not found in the ileum, but are a distinctive feature of the duodenum.

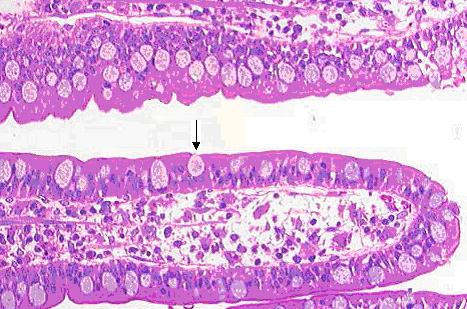
Goblet cells in the wall of an ileum vili. At its sides, enterocytes are visible over a core of lamina propria.

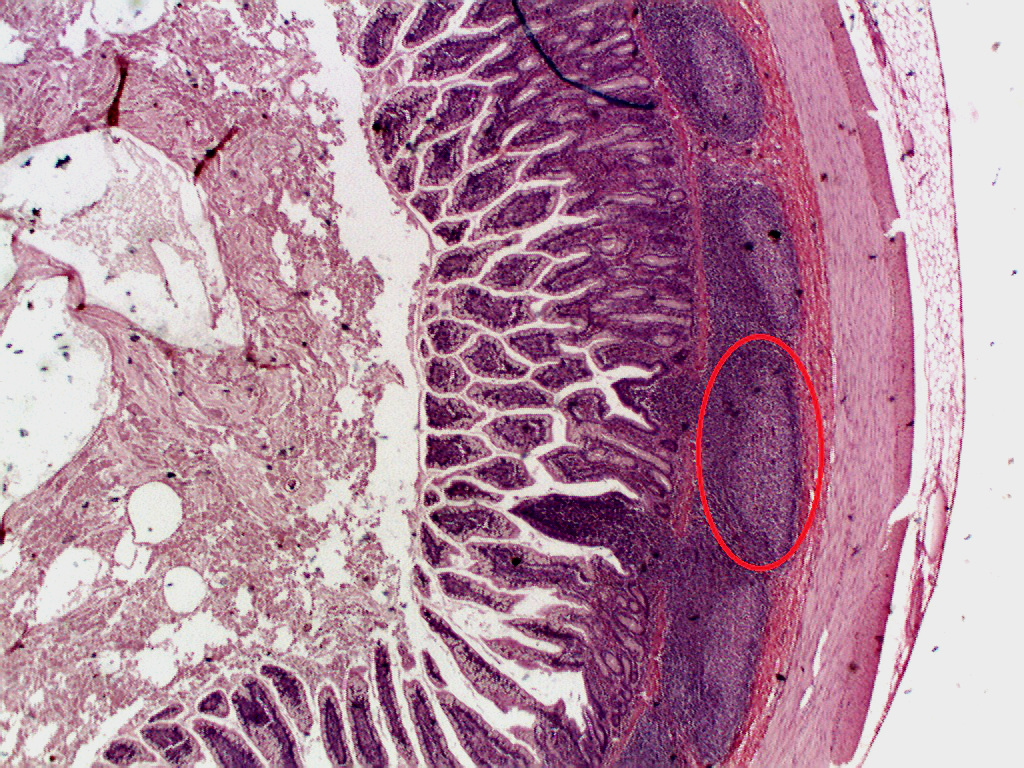
Cross section of ileum with a Peyer's patch circled.

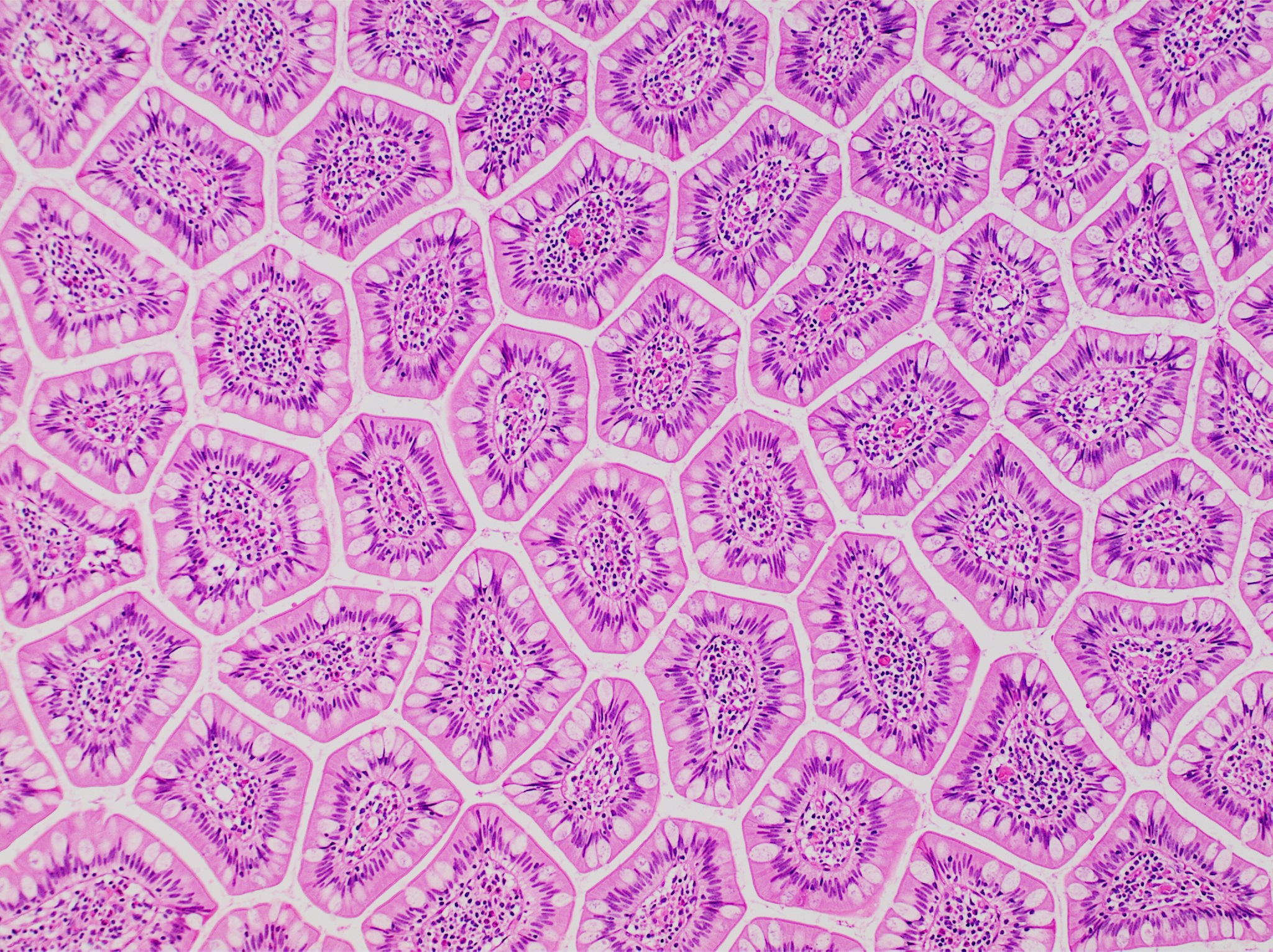
Cross-section histology of intestinal villi of the human terminal ileum.

=== Development ===
The small intestine develops from the midgut of the primitive gut tube. By the fifth week of embryological life, the ileum begins to grow longer at a very fast rate, forming a U-shaped fold called the primary intestinal loop. The proximal half of this loop will form the ileum. The loop grows so fast in length that it outgrows the abdomen and protrudes through the umbilicus. By week 10, the loop retracts back into the abdomen. Between weeks six and ten the small intestine rotates anticlockwise, as viewed from the front of the embryo. It rotates a further 180 degrees after it has moved back into the abdomen. This process creates the twisted shape of the large intestine.

In the fetus the ileum is connected to the navel by the vitelline duct. In roughly 2−4% of humans, this duct fails to close during the first seven weeks after birth, leaving a remnant called Meckel's diverticulum.

== Function ==
The main function of the ileum is to absorb vitamin B_{12}, bile salts, and whatever products of digestion were not absorbed by the jejunum. The wall itself is made up of folds, each of which has many tiny finger-like projections known as villi on its surface. In turn, the epithelial cells that line these villi possess even larger numbers of microvilli. Therefore, the ileum has an extremely large surface area both for the adsorption (attachment) of enzyme molecules and for the absorption of products of digestion. The DNES (diffuse neuroendocrine system) cells of the ileum secrete various hormones (gastrin, secretin, cholecystokinin) into the blood. Cells in the lining of the ileum secrete the protease and carbohydrase enzymes responsible for the final stages of protein and carbohydrate digestion into the lumen of the intestine. These enzymes are present in the cytoplasm of the epithelial cells.

The villi contain large numbers of capillaries that take the amino acids and glucose produced by digestion to the hepatic portal vein and the liver. Lacteals are small lymph vessels, and are present in villi. They absorb fatty acid and glycerol, the products of fat digestion. Layers of circular and longitudinal smooth muscle enable the chyme (partly digested food and water) to be pushed along the ileum by waves of muscle contractions called peristalsis. The remaining chyme is passed to the colon.

== Clinical significance ==
The ileum is of importance in medicine as it can be affected in a number of diseases, including:

- Crohn's disease
- Tuberculosis
- Lymphoma
- Neuroendocrine tumors (carcinoid)

== Other animals ==
In veterinary anatomy, the ileum is distinguished from the jejunum by being that portion of the jejunoileum that is connected to the caecum by the ileocecal fold.

The ileum is the short termi of the small intestine and the connection to the large intestine. It is suspended by the caudal part of the mesentery (mesoileum) and is attached, in addition, to the cecum by the ileocecal fold. The ileum terminates at the cecocolic junction of the large intestine forming the ileal orifice. In the dog the ileal orifice is located at the level of the first or second lumbar vertebra, in the ox in the level of the fourth lumbar vertebrae, in the sheep and goat at the level of the caudal point of the costal arch. By active muscular contraction of the ileum, and closure of the ileal opening as a result of engorgement, the ileum prevents the backflow of ingesta and the equalization of pressure between jejunum and the base of the cecum. Disturbance of this sensitive balance is not uncommon and is one of the causes of colic in horses. During any intestinal surgery, for instance, during appendectomy, distal 2 feet of ileum should be checked for the presence of Meckel's diverticulum.
