= Appendix (anatomy) =

Tube attached to the intestine

- Appendix with surrounding structures

- Variations of the appendix

Details
- Precursor: Midgut
- System: Digestive system
- Artery: Appendicular artery
- Vein: Appendicular vein

Identifiers
- Latin: Appendix vermiformis
- MeSH: D001065
- TA98: A05.7.02.007
- TA2: 2976
- FMA: 14542

In the human body, the appendix (pl.: appendices or appendixes; also vermiform appendix; cecal (or caecal, cæcal) appendix; vermix; or vermiform process) is a finger-like, blind-ended tube connected to the cecum.

The cecum is a pouch-like structure of the large intestine, located at the junction of the small and the large intestines. The term "vermiform" comes from Latin and means "worm-shaped".

The function of the appendix has long been unclear, and if it becomes inflamed (appendicitis), doctors may surgically remove it (appendectomy). Since the early 2000s, extensive work has been conducted regarding potential functions of the appendix (for example, serving as a reservoir for beneficial gut bacteria).

== Structure ==
The human appendix averages 9 cm in length, ranging from 5 to 35 mm (0.20 to 1.38 in). The diameter of the appendix is 6 mm (0.24 in); any larger is considered a thickened or inflamed appendix. The appendix is usually located in the lower right quadrant of the abdomen, near the right hip bone. The base of the appendix is located 2 cm (0.79 in) beneath the ileocecal valve that separates the large intestine from the small intestine. Its position within the abdomen corresponds to a point on the surface known as McBurney's point.

The appendix is connected to the mesentery in the lower region of the ileum, by a short region of the mesocolon known as the mesoappendix.

=== Variation ===
Some identical twins – known as mirror image twins – can have a mirror-imaged anatomy, a congenital condition where one has the appendix located in the lower left quadrant of the abdomen instead of the lower right. Intestinal malrotation may also cause displacement of the appendix to the left side.

While the base of the appendix is typically located 2 cm (0.79 in) below the ileocecal valve, the tip of the appendix can be variably located–in the pelvis, outside the peritoneum or behind the cecum. The prevalence of the different positions varies amongst populations for example, the retrocecal position is most common in Ghana and Sudan, with 67.3% and 58.3% occurrence respectively, in comparison to Iran and Bosnia where the pelvic position is most common, with 55.8% and 57.7% occurrence respectively.

In rare cases, the appendix may be absent (laparotomies for suspected appendicitis have given a frequency of 1 in 100,000).

Sometimes a semi-circular fold of mucous membrane appears at the opening of the appendix. This valve of the vermiform appendix is also called Gerlach's valve.

== Functions ==
=== Maintaining gut flora ===
A possible function of the human appendix is a "safe house" for beneficial bacteria in the recovery from diarrhea

Gut-associated lymphoid tissue is immune tissue surrounding the appendix and appearing elsewhere in the gut. It carries out several important functions. Initially, due to an absence of side effects following its removal, the appendix was deemed to lack any specific function.

William Parker, Randy Bollinger, and colleagues at Duke University proposed in 2007 that the appendix serves as a haven for beneficial bacteria when illness or antibiotics flush them from the intestines. This proposition is based on an understanding of how the immune system supports the growth of beneficial intestinal bacteria, in combination with other well-known features of the appendix, including its architecture, its location just below the normal one-way flow of food and germs in the large intestine, and its association with copious amounts of immune tissue.

Research in 2012 reported that individuals without an appendix were twice as likely to have a recurrence of Clostridioides difficile colitis. The appendix, therefore, may act as a reservoir for beneficial bacteria. This reservoir could repopulate the gut flora following a bout of gastrointestinal illness.

=== Immune and lymphatic systems ===
The appendix is an important component of mammalian mucosal immune function, particularly B cell–mediated immune responses and extrathymically derived T cells. This structure helps in the proper movement and removal of waste matter in the digestive system, contains lymphatic vessels that regulate pathogens, and lastly, might even produce early defence against disease. Additionally, this may provide immune defence from invading pathogens and stimulating B and T cells to fight viruses and bacteria that infect that portion of the bowel and training them so that immune responses are targeted and more able to fight pathogens. In addition, immune cells called innate lymphoid cells help the appendix maintain digestive health.

A 2016 study reported a positive correlation between the presence of the appendix and the concentration of cecal lymphoid tissue, supporting the suggestion that the appendix provides major immune benefits.

== Disease ==
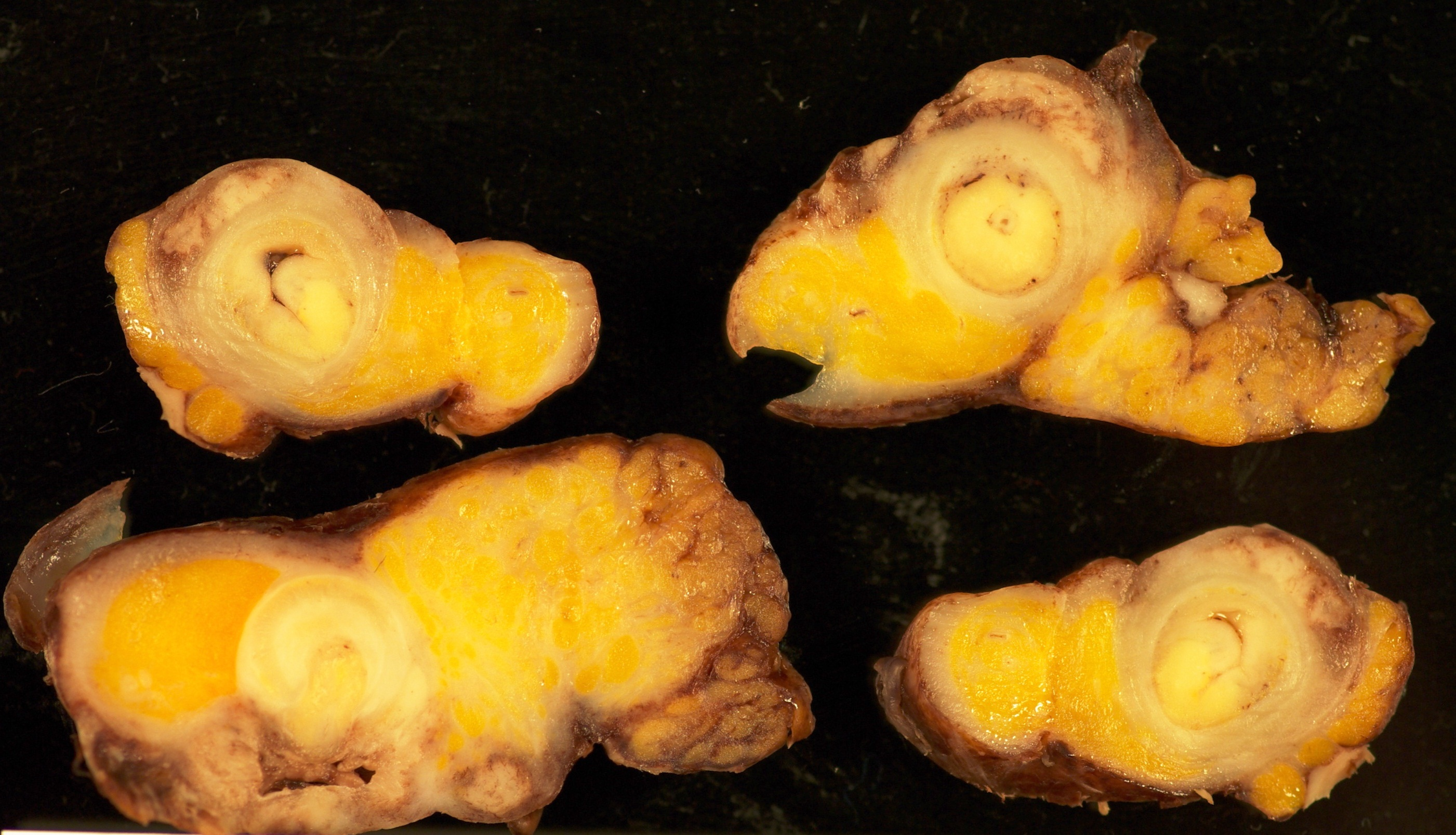
An appendiceal carcinoid tumor

Common diseases of the appendix (in humans) are appendicitis and carcinoid tumors (appendiceal carcinoid). Appendix cancer accounts for about 1 in 200 of all gastrointestinal malignancies. In rare cases, adenomas are present.

=== Appendicitis ===
Appendicitis is a condition characterized by inflammation of the appendix. Pain often begins in the center of the abdomen, corresponding to the appendix's development as part of the embryonic midgut. This pain is typically a dull, poorly localized, visceral pain.

As the inflammation progresses, the pain begins to localize more clearly to the right lower quadrant, as the peritoneum becomes inflamed. This inflammation, or peritonitis, results in rebound tenderness (pain upon removal of pressure rather than the application of pressure). In particular, it presents at McBurney's point, 1/3 of the way along a line drawn from the anterior superior iliac spine to the umbilicus. Typically, point (skin) pain is not present until the parietal peritoneum is inflamed as well. Fever and an immune system response are also characteristic. Other signs and symptoms include nausea and vomiting, fever, constipation or diarrhea, abdominal bloating, or flatulence.

Untreated, the appendix may rupture, leading to peritonitis, followed by shock, and, if still untreated, death.

Appendectomy is the surgical removal of the appendix. This removal is typically performed as an emergency procedure in a patient suffering from acute appendicitis. In the absence of surgical facilities, intravenous antibiotics are used to delay or avoid the onset of sepsis. In some cases, the appendicitis resolves; otherwise, an inflammatory mass forms around the appendix. This is a relative contraindication to surgery.

== Uses ==
The appendix can be used to construct an efferent urinary conduit, in an operation known as the Mitrofanoff procedure, in people with a neurogenic bladder.

The appendix can also be used to access the colon in children with paralysed bowels or major sphincter dysfunction. The appendix is lifted from the abdomen, and a catheter can be attached, which allows the colon to be irrigated (via normal defecation).

== History ==
Charles Darwin suggested that earlier hominids used the appendix mainly to digest fibrous vegetation, before evolving. The large cecum of some herbivorous animals, such as the horse, rodents, or the koala, appears to support this hypothesis. The koala's cecum enables it to host bacteria that specifically help to break down cellulose. Human ancestors may have also relied on it to digest a diet rich in foliage.

As people shifted to eat more easily digested foods, the cecum became less necessary for digestion. Mutations that were previously deleterious lost their salience, which allowed them to survive. These alleles became more frequent, and the cecum shrank. After millions of years, the human cecum became the appendix.

Dr. Heather F. Smith and colleagues stated:

Recently ... improved understanding of gut immunity has merged with current thinking in biological and medical science, pointing to an apparent function of the mammalian cecal appendix as a safe-house for symbiotic gut microbes, preserving the flora during times of gastrointestinal infection in societies without modern medicine. This function is potentially a selective force for the evolution and maintenance of the appendix. Three morphotypes of cecal-appendices can be described among mammals based primarily on the shape of the cecum: a distinct appendix branching from a rounded or sac-like cecum (as in many primate species), an appendix located at the apex of a long and voluminous cecum (as in the rabbit, greater glider and Cape dune mole rat), and an appendix in the absence of a pronounced cecum (as in the wombat). In addition, long, narrow appendix-like structures are found in mammals that either lack an apparent cecum (as in monotremes) or lack a distinct junction between the cecum and appendix-like structure (as in the koala). A cecal appendix has evolved independently at least twice and represents yet another example of convergence in morphology between Australian marsupials and placentals in the rest of the world. Although the appendix has apparently been lost by numerous species, it has also been maintained for more than 80 million years in at least one clade.

A 2013 study estimated that the appendix independently evolved in different animals 32-38 times, but was lost no more than six times. A 2017 study of an updated database yielded similar results, with estimates of at least 29 gains and at most 12 losses (all of which were ambiguous). This suggests that the cecal appendix has a selection advantage and is not vestigial. It appears to be associated with greater longevity. For example, a 2023 study reported protective functions against diarrhea in young primates.

That function may be particularly useful in the absence of sanitation and healthcare, where diarrhea may be prevalent. Epidemiological data on the cause of death in developing countries collected by the World Health Organization in 2001 reported that acute diarrhea was the fourth leading cause of disease-related death in developing countries. Two of the other leading causes of death were claimed to have exerted limited or no selection pressure.

== Gallery ==
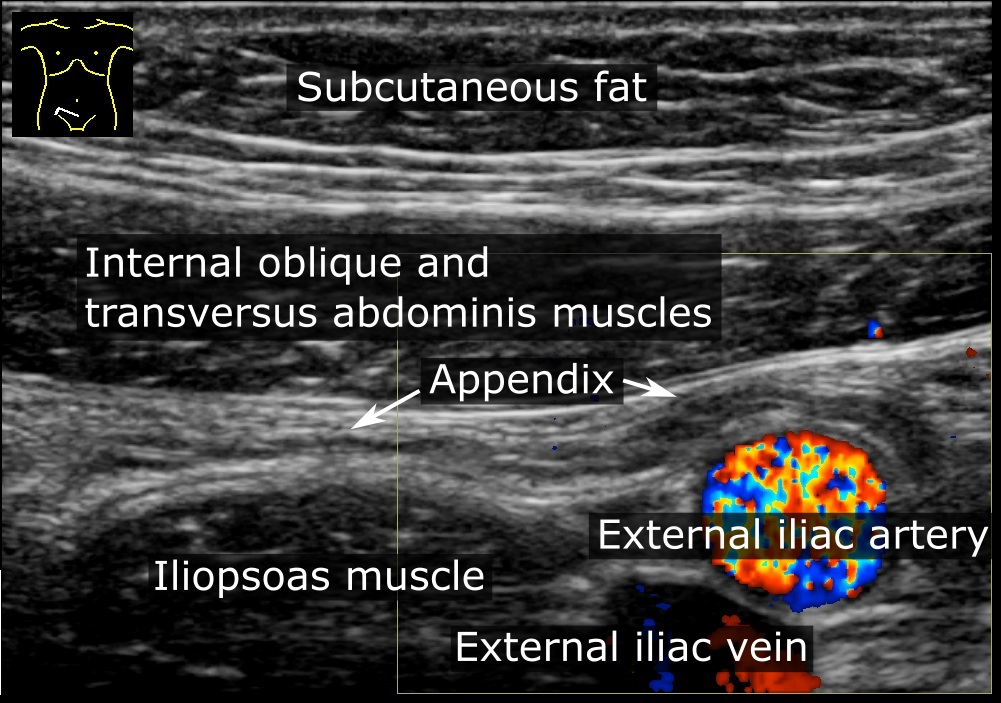
Abdominal ultrasound showing a normal appendix between the external iliac artery and the abdominal wall

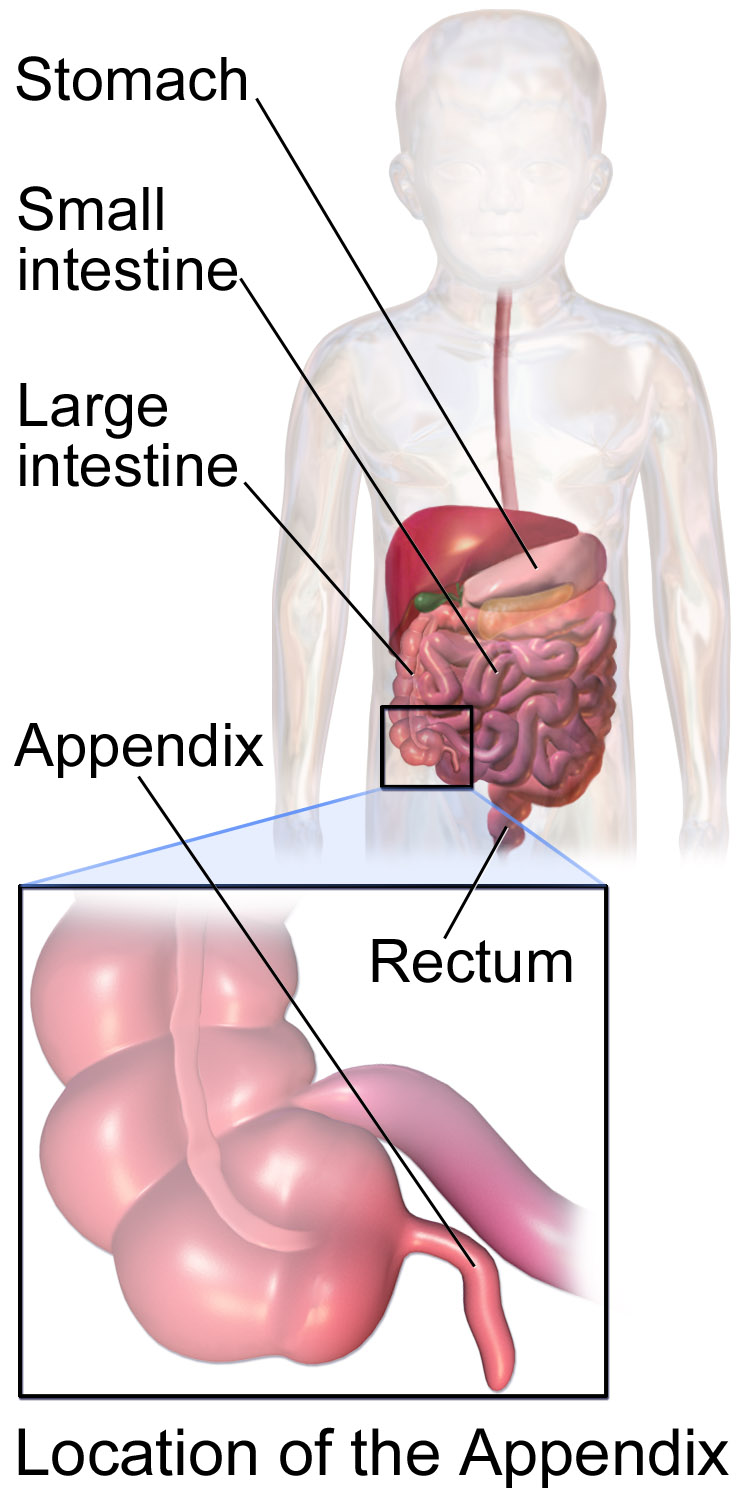
Illustration depicting the location of the appendix in a child

Normal location of the appendix relative to other organs of the digestive system (frontal view)

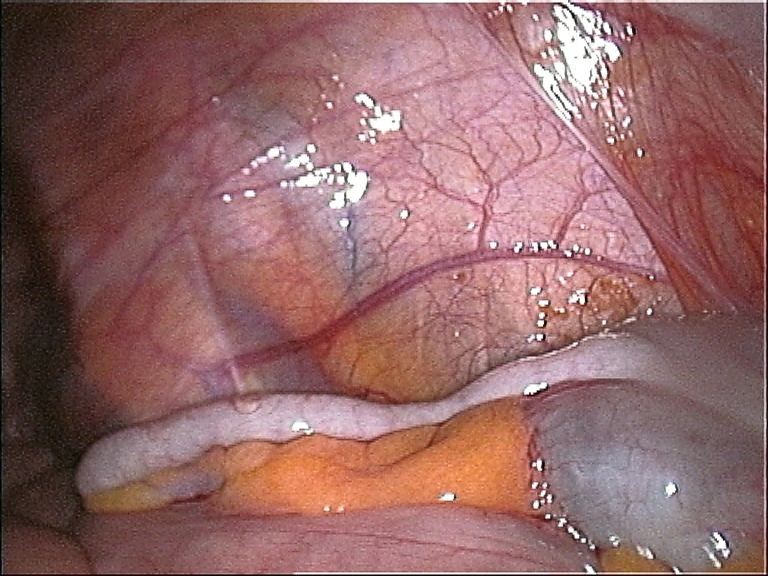
Vermiform appendix

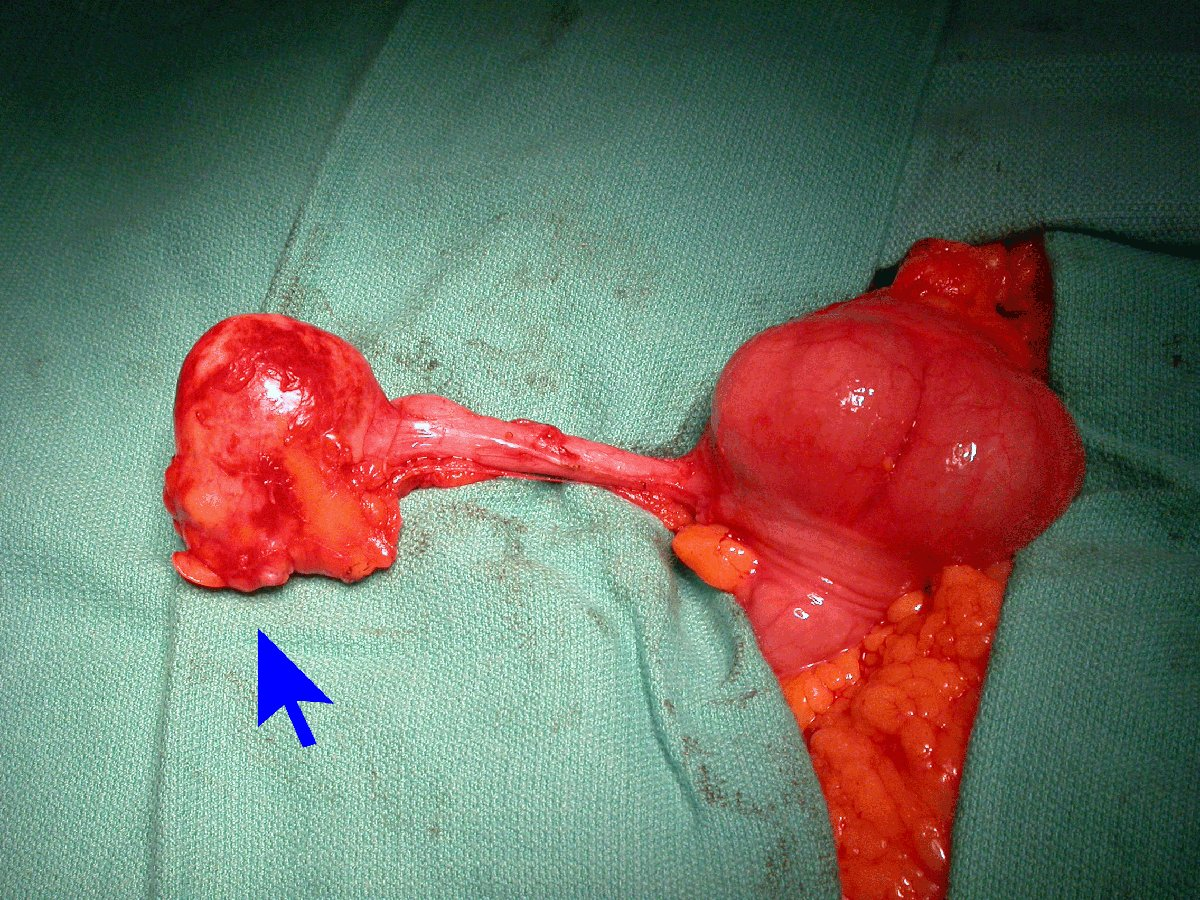
Mucinous adenocarcinoma of the appendix tip

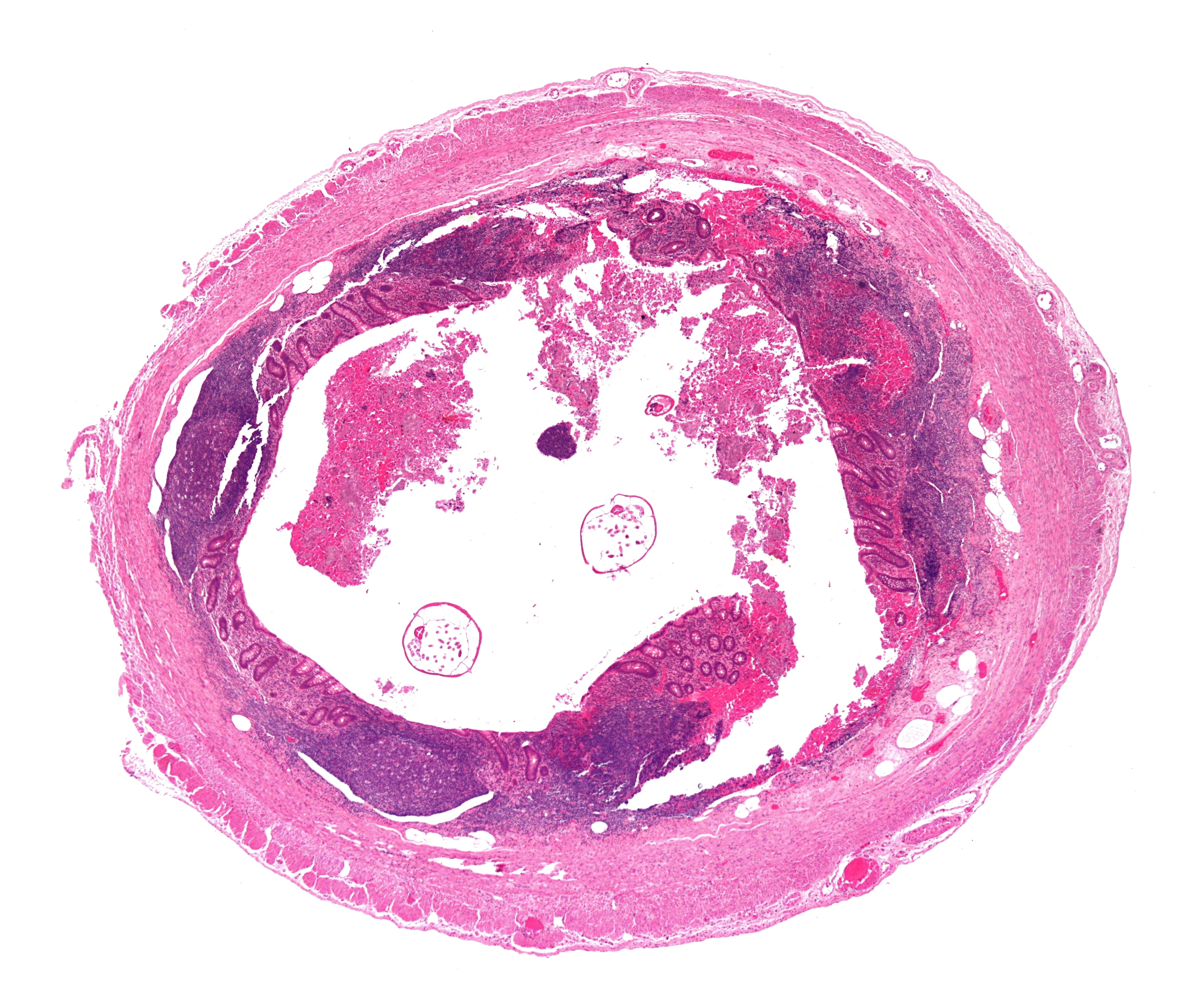
Cross section of the appendix with Enterobius with H&E stain

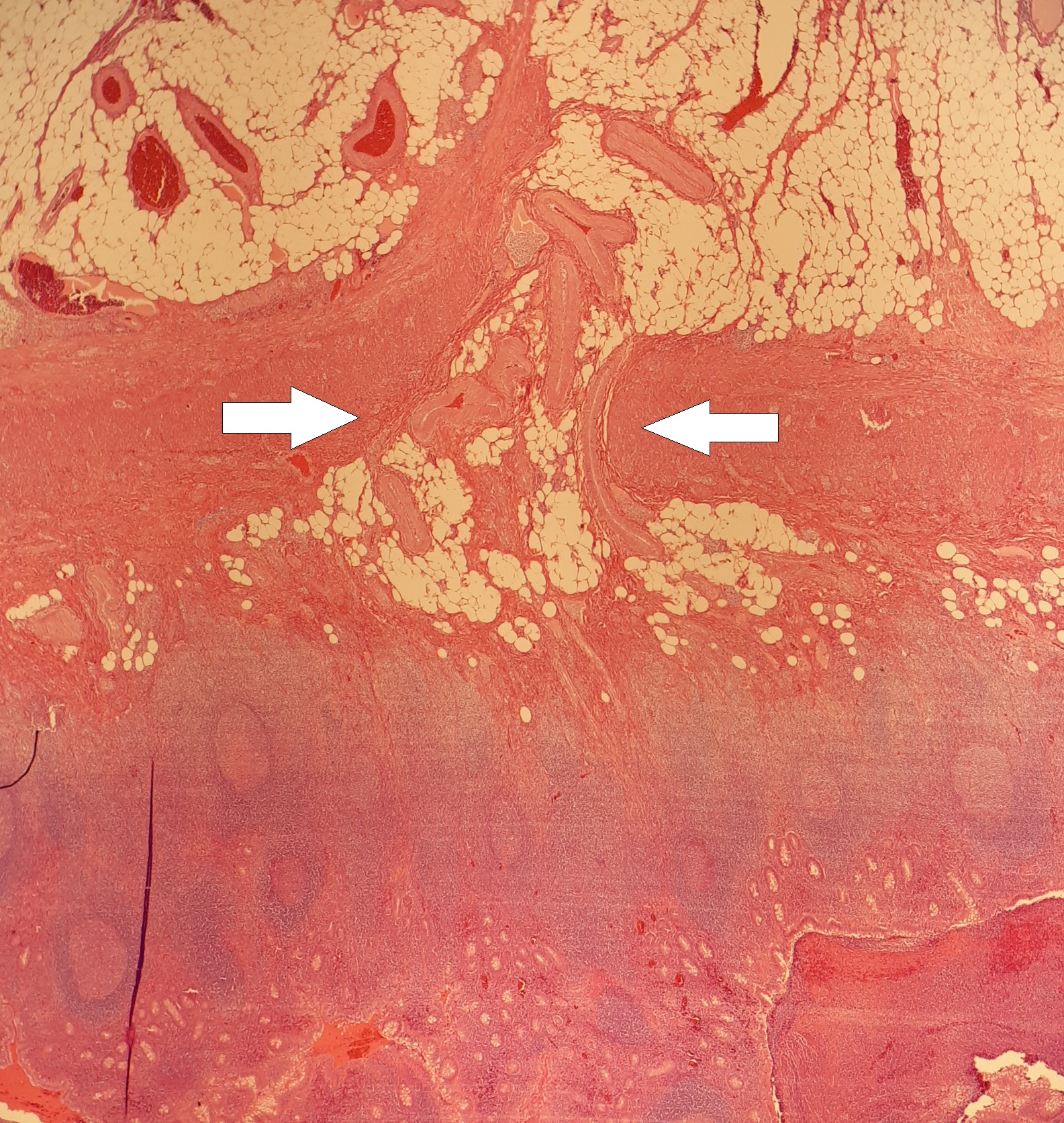
Micrograph of entry point of appendicular arteries (arrows at level of inner muscular layer), not to be confused with a perforation.

== See also ==
- Meckel's diverticulum
- Appendix of the epididymis, a detached efferent duct of the epididymis
- Appendix testis, a vestigial remnant of the Müllerian duct
- Epiploic appendix, one of several small pouches of fat on the peritoneum along the colon and rectum
  - Appendix of the laryngeal ventricle, a sac that extends from the laryngeal ventricle
- Mesoappendix, the portion of the mesentery that connects the ileum to the vermiform appendix
