= Cecum =

Pouch in the large intestine

- The cecum, here in red, lies at the start of the large intestine, which is shown with the rest of the human gastrointestinal tract in this image.

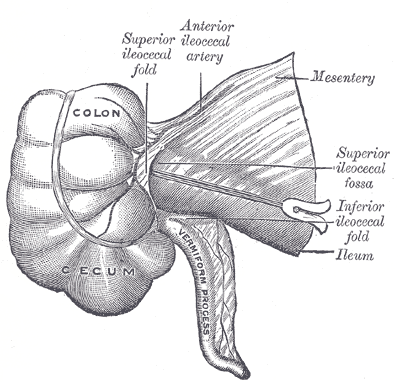
- Superior ileocecal fossa (cecum labeled at bottom left)

Details
- Precursor: Midgut
- Part of: Large intestine
- System: Gastrointestinal
- Location: Lower right part of the abdomen

Identifiers
- Latin: caecum
- MeSH: D002432
- TA98: A05.7.02.001
- TA2: 2970
- FMA: 14541

The cecum (UK: caecum, pronounced /ˈsiː.kəm/; plural ceca or UK: caeca, pronounced /ˈsiː.kə/) is a pouch within the peritoneum that is considered to be the beginning of the large intestine. It is typically located on the right side of the body (the same side of the body as the appendix, to which it is joined). The term stems from the Latin caecus, meaning "blind".

It receives chyme from the ileum, and connects to the ascending colon of the large intestine. It is separated from the ileum by the ileocecal valve (ICV), also called Bauhin's valve. It is also separated from the colon by the cecocolic junction. While the cecum is usually intraperitoneal, the ascending colon is retroperitoneal.

In herbivores, the cecum stores food material where bacteria are able to break down the cellulose. In humans, the cecum is involved in absorption of salts and electrolytes and lubricates the solid waste that passes into the large intestine.

== Structure ==
Inner diameters of different sections of the large intestine, with cecum (at bottom left) measuring on average 8.7 cm (range 8.0-10.5 cm).

=== Development ===
The cecum and appendix are derived from the bud of cecum that forms during week six in the midgut next to the apex of the umbilical herniation. Specifically, the cecum and appendix are formed by the enlargement of the postarterial segment of the midgut loop. The proximal part of the bud grows rapidly to form the cecum. The lateral wall of the cecum grows much more rapidly than the medial wall, with the result that the point of attachment of the appendix comes to lie on the medial side. The cecum's position changes after the midgut rotates and the ascending colon elongates, and the accumulation of meconium inside the cecum may result in the latter's increased diameter.

== History ==
=== Etymology ===
The term cecum comes from Latin (intestinum) caecum, literally 'blind intestine', in the sense 'blind gut' or 'cul de sac'. It is a direct translation from Ancient Greek τυφλὸν (ἔντερον) typhlòn (énteron). Thus the inflammation of the cecum is called typhlitis.

In dissections by the Greek philosophers, the connection between the ileum of the small intestine and the cecum was not fully understood. Most of the studies of the digestive tract were done on animals and the results were compared to human structures.

The junction between the small intestine and the colon, called the ileocecal valve, is so small in some animals that it was not considered to be a connection between the small and large intestines. During a dissection, the colon could be traced from the rectum, to the sigmoid colon, through the descending, transverse, and ascending sections. The cecum is an end point for the colon with a dead-end portion terminating with the appendix.

The connection between the end of the small intestine (ileum) and the start (as viewed from the perspective of food being processed) of the colon (cecum) is now clearly understood, and is called the ileocecal orifice. The connection between the end of the cecum and the beginning of the ascending colon is called the cecocolic orifice.

== Clinical significance ==
A cecal carcinoid tumor is a carcinoid tumor of the cecum. An appendiceal carcinoid tumor (a carcinoid tumor of the appendix) is sometimes found next to a cecal carcinoid.

Neutropenic enterocolitis (typhlitis) is the condition of inflammation of the cecum, primarily caused by bacterial infections.

Over 99% of the bacteria in the gut are anaerobes but, in the cecum, aerobic bacteria reach high densities.

== Other animals ==
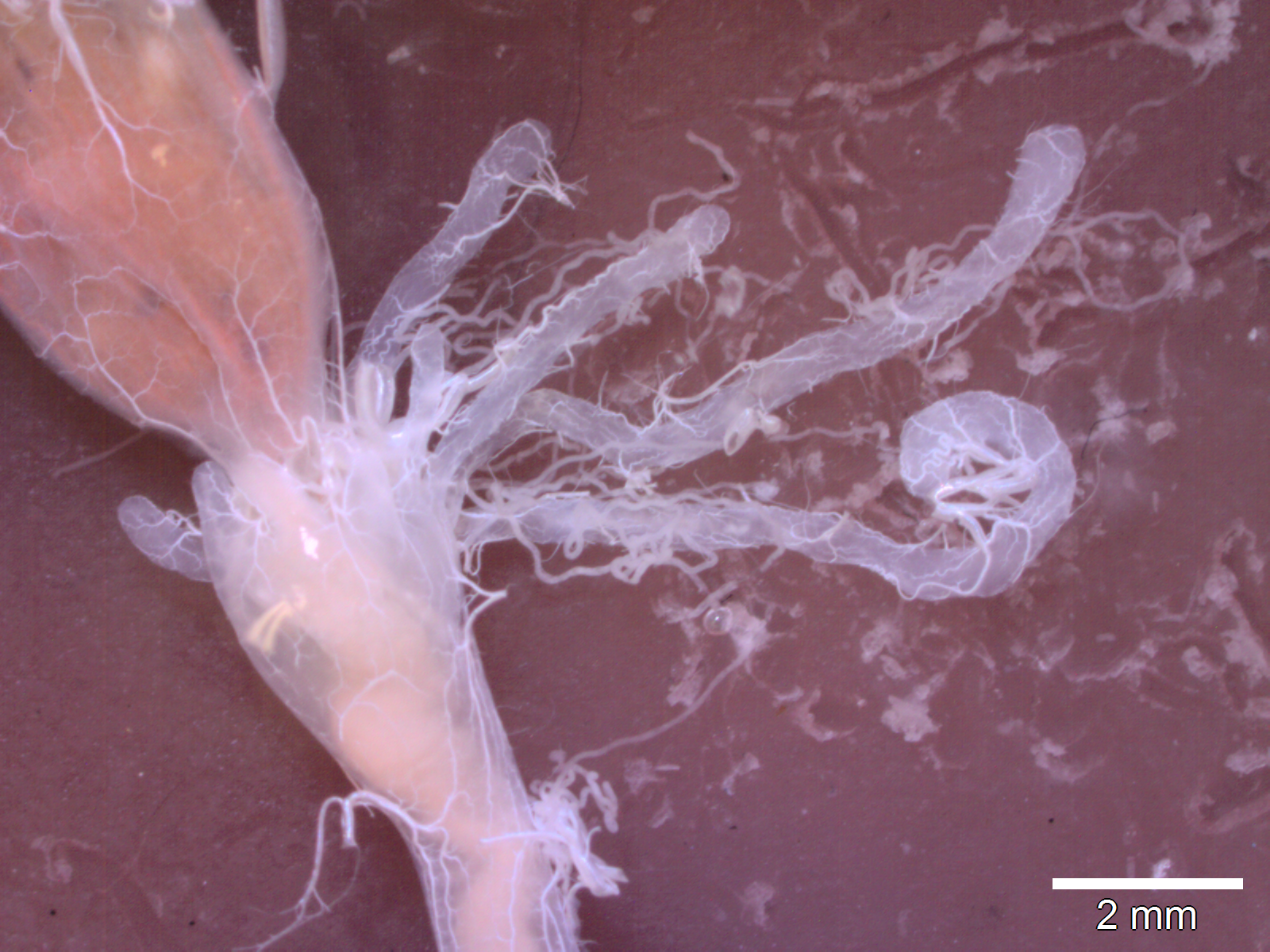
Gastric cecum of dissected cockroach. Scale bar, 2 mm.

A cecum is present in most amniote species, and also in lungfish, but not in any living species of amphibian. In reptiles, it is usually a single median structure, arising from the dorsal side of the large intestine. The ceca in birds are often paired, with many exceptions; parrots, for example, do not have ceca, while others may have a single cecum or even two pairs, like the secretarybird.

Most mammalian herbivores have a relatively large cecum. In many species, it is considerably wider than the colon. For some herbivores such as lagomorphs (rabbits, hares, pikas), easily digestible food is processed in the gastrointestinal tract and expelled as regular feces. But in order to get nutrients out of hard-to-digest fiber, lagomorphs ferment fiber in the cecum and then expel the contents as cecotropes, which are reingested (cecotrophy). The cecotropes are then absorbed in the small intestine to utilize the nutrients.

In contrast, obligate carnivores, whose diets contain little or no plant matter, have a reduced cecum, which is often partially or wholly replaced by the appendix. Mammalian species which do not develop a cecum include raccoons, bears, and the red panda. Hyraxes, unlike other mammals, have two paired ceca.

Many fish have a number of small outpockets, called pyloric ceca, along their intestine; despite the name, they are not homologous with the cecum of amniotes – their function is to increase the overall area of the digestive epithelium. Some invertebrates, such as squid, may also have structures with the same name, but these have no relationship with those of vertebrates.

== Gallery ==
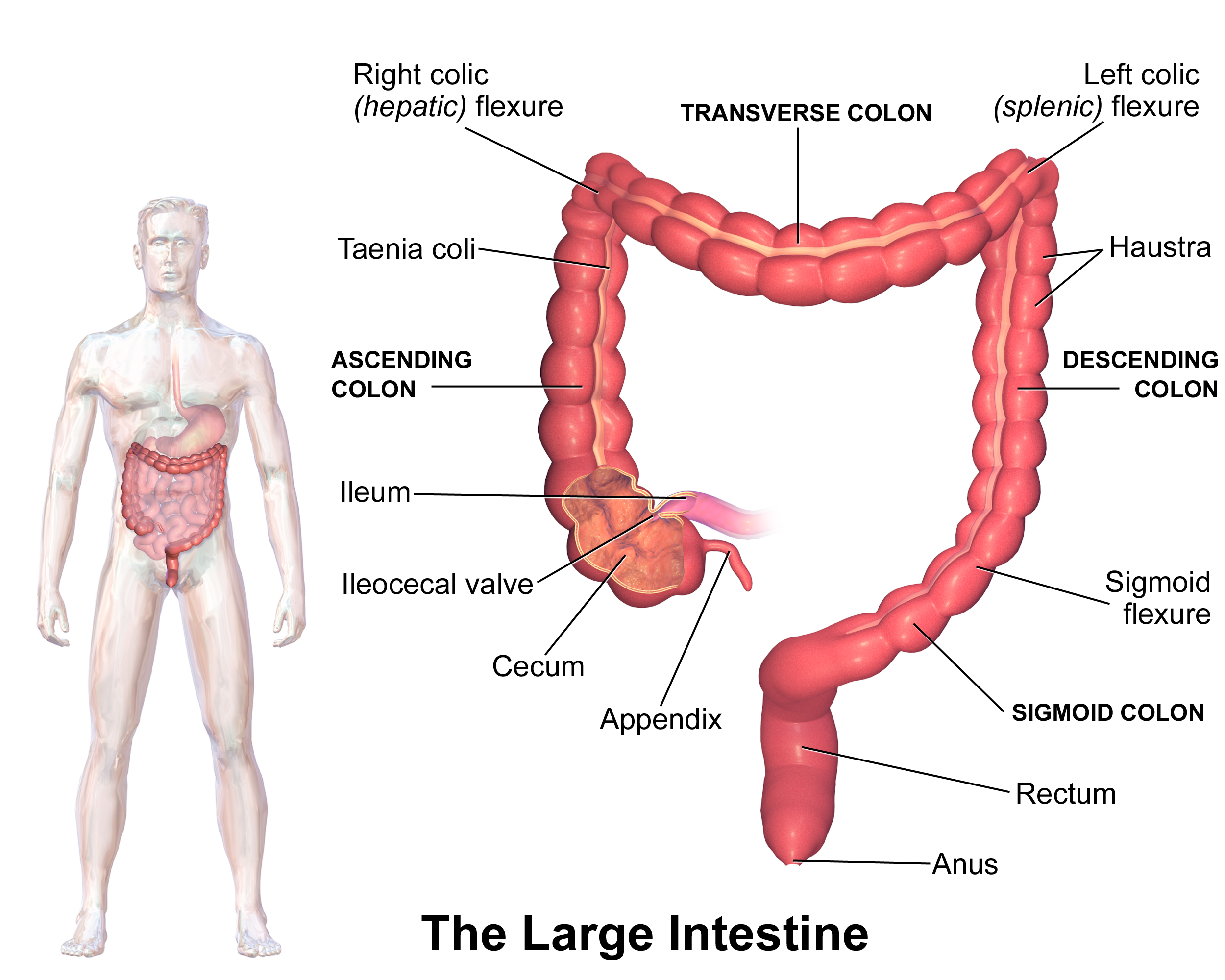
Illustration of the large intestine

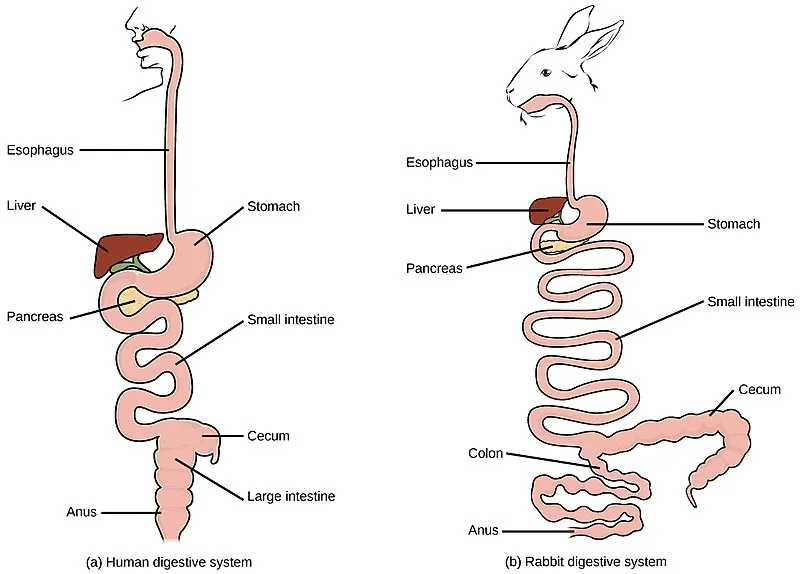
Illustration of human and rabbit cecum

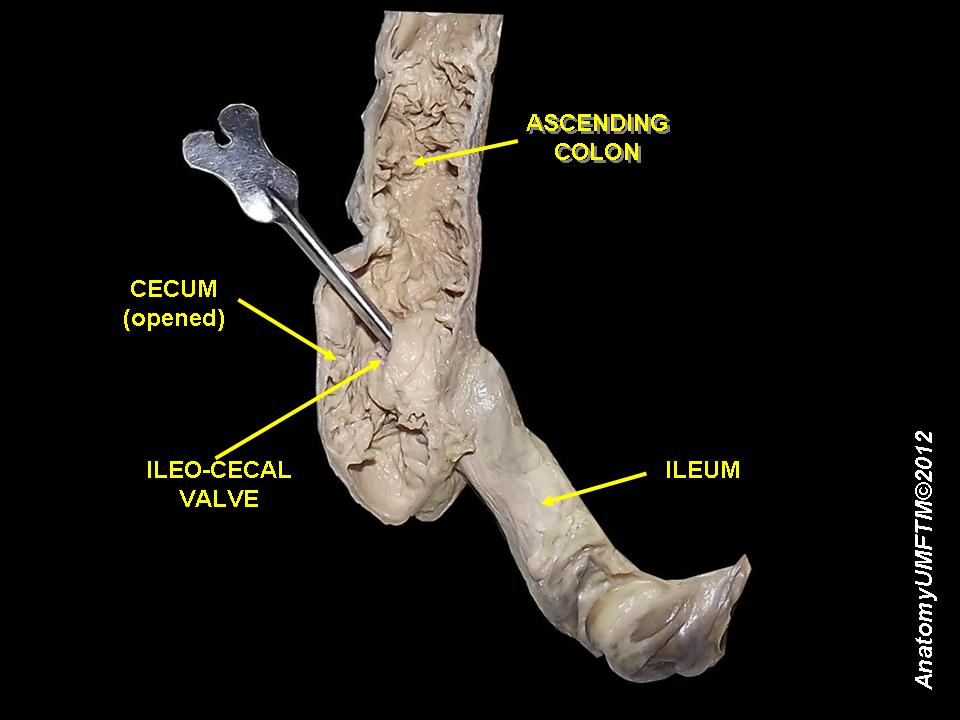
Cecum and ileum

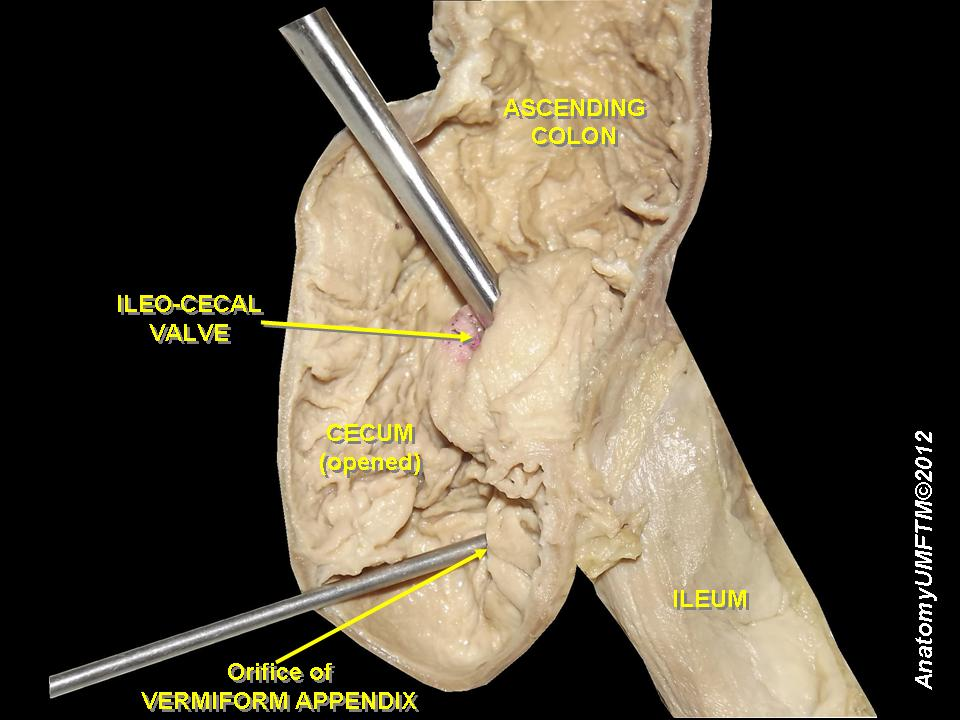
Ileo-cecal valve

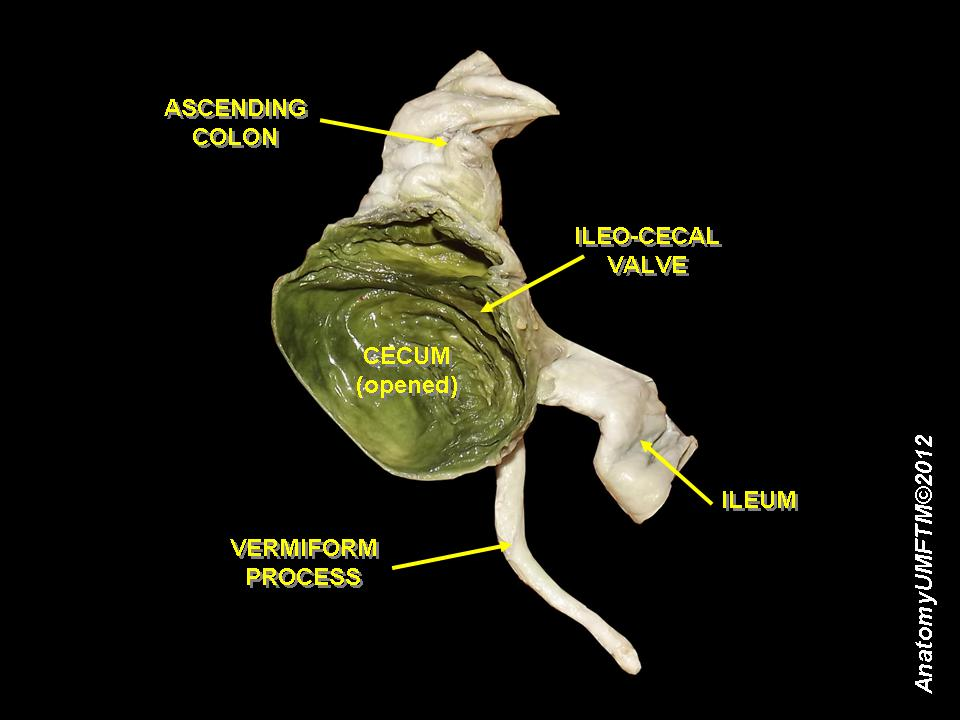
Cecum

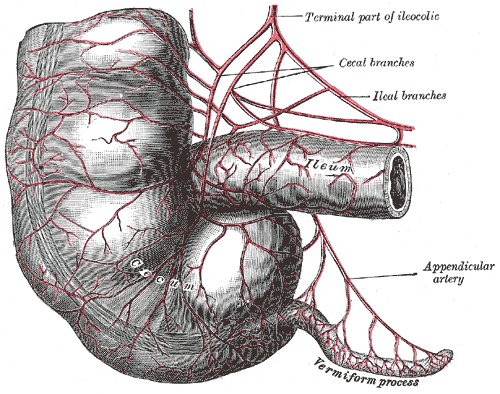
Arteries of cecum and vermiform process

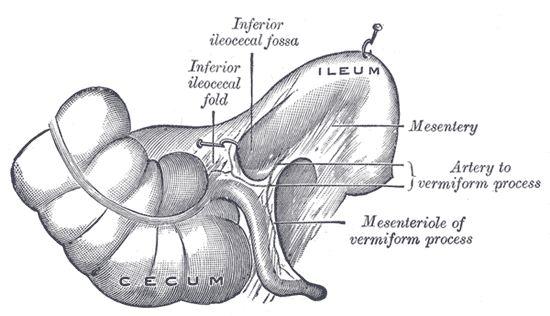
Inferior ileocecal fossa

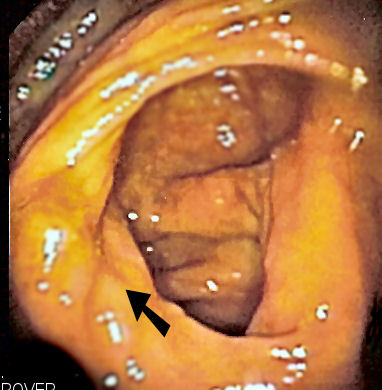
Endoscopic image of cecum with arrow pointing to ileocecal valve in foreground

== See also ==
- McBurney's point
