= Epiploic appendix =

Pouches of the peritoneum

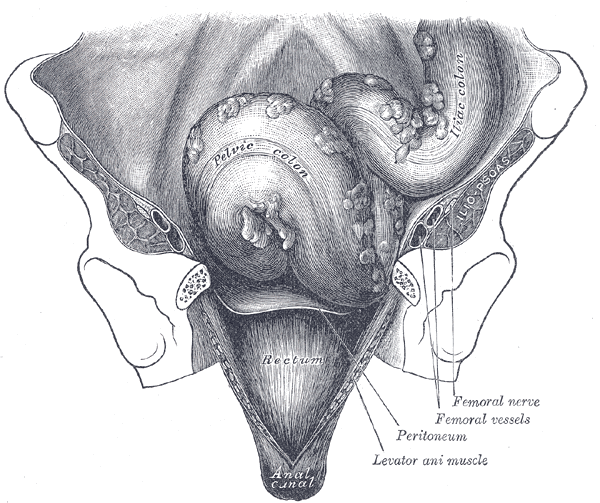
- Iliac colon, sigmoid or pelvic colon, and rectum seen from the front, after removal of pubic bones and bladder. (Lumps of fat visible at right.)

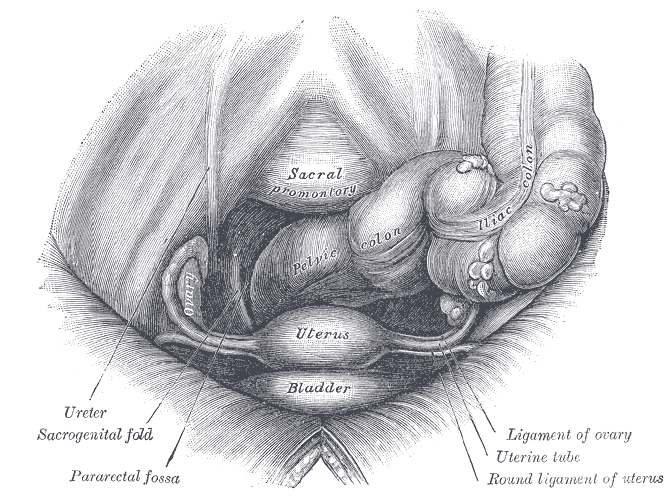
- Female pelvis and its contents, seen from above and in front. (Lumps of fat visible at right.)

Details

Identifiers
- Latin: appendices omentales, appendices epiploicae
- TA98: A05.7.03.010
- TA2: 2990
- FMA: 76481

The epiploic appendices (or appendices epiploicae, or epiploic appendages, or appendix epiploica, or omental appendices) are small pouches of the peritoneum filled with fat and situated along the colon, but are absent in the rectum.

They are chiefly appended to the transverse and sigmoid parts of the colon, however, their function is unknown.

The appendages can become inflamed in a painful process known as epiploic appendagitis which can mimic acute appendicitis and other conditions.
