= C1orf159 =

Protein encoded on a gene

Identifiers
- Aliases: C1orf159, chromosome 1 open reading frame 159
- External IDs: MGI: 2444364; HomoloGene: 51678; GeneCards: C1orf159; OMA:C1orf159 - orthologs

Gene location (Human)
Chr.	Chromosome 1 (human)
Band	1p36.33	Start	1,081,818 bp
Band	1p36.33	End	1,116,361 bp

Gene location (Mouse)
Chr.	Chromosome 4 (mouse)
Band	4|4 E2	Start	156,194,439 bp
Band	4|4 E2	End	156,211,722 bp
RNA expression pattern
Bgee	Human / Mouse (ortholog); Top expressed in: left testis; right testis; right uterine tube; right frontal lobe; mucosa of transverse colon; granulocyte; anterior cingulate cortex; right hemisphere of cerebellum; apex of heart; body of stomach / Top expressed in: spermatocyte; ventricular zone; otic vesicle; saccule; otic placode; epiblast; yolk sac; blastocyst; tail of embryo; thymus; More reference expression data
BioGPS	n/a
Orthologs
Species	Human	Mouse
Entrez	54991	230996
Ensembl	ENSG00000131591	ENSMUSG00000059939
UniProt	Q96HA4	n/a
RefSeq (mRNA)	NM_017891; NM_001330306; NM_001363525	NM_145557; NM_177205
RefSeq (protein)	NP_001317235; NP_060361; NP_001350454	n/a
Location (UCSC)	Chr 1: 1.08 – 1.12 Mb	Chr 4: 156.19 – 156.21 Mb
PubMed search
- Wikidata
View/Edit Human	View/Edit Mouse

C1orf159 is a protein that in human is encoded by the C1orf159 gene located on chromosome 1. This gene is also found to be an unfavorable prognosis marker for renal and liver cancer, and a favorable prognosis marker for urothelial cancer.

== Gene ==
The Homo sapiens C1orf159 gene (UniProt ID: Q96HA4) is a gene located on the short arm of chromosome 1 at locus 1p36.33. The gene is 34,247 base pairs in length, located at Chromosome 1 position 1,081,818 to 1,116,089 on the reverse strand.

== Transcript ==
The longest variant of human C1orf159 gene encodes an mRNA that is 2,432 nucleotides in length with 12 exons. A promoter region was predicted using UCSC Genome Browser, which is 762 nucleotides long, including a 434 nucleotide upstream of the transcriptional start site, exon 1, and a 298 nucleotide region of intron 1.

== Protein ==
=== Isoforms ===
Alternative splicing of the gene creates 5 protein isoforms. The longest isoform is 380 amino acids in length with a molecular mass of 40.382 kDa.

Isoforms of human C1orf159 protein
Isoform	UniProt ID	Length (aa)
1	Q96HA4-1	380
2	Q96HA4-2	185
3	Q96HA4-3	189
4	Q96HA4-4	198
5	Q96HA4-5	254

=== Composition ===
C1orf159 protein is a proline- and arginine-rich, and a lysine- and glutamic acid- poor protein. The isoelectric point of the human C1orf159 protein is 10.07, which is more basic than the average human proteomic protein pI of 7.36.

=== Domain ===
The human C1orf159 protein contains a domain of unknown function DUF4501. Although the exact function of the domain is not clear, it is thought to be a single pass-membrane protein with highly conserved cysteine residues.

The protein also contains a transmembrane domain at positions 144-169 and a signal peptide at positions 1-18.

=== Structure ===
Alphafold predicts the structure of human C1orf159 protein to be mainly composed of alpha-helices.

=== Post-translational modification ===
The predicted post-translational modifications of the C1orf159 protein includes N-linked glycosylation on asparagine at positions 104, 111, and 128.

== Homology/evolution ==
=== Orthologs ===
Orthologs of human C1orf159 are found in vertebrates including mammals, birds, reptiles, amphibians, and fish with the most distantly related group of organisms being cartilaginous fish, with a date of divergence of approximately 450 million years ago. Orthologs are not found in jawless fish or invertebrates.

Orthologs of C1orf159 Protein
Species	Group	Taxonomic Group	NCBI Protein Accession Number	Protein Sequence Similarity (% Relative to Human Protein)
Human	Mammals	Primates	NP_001317235.1	100.0
Chimpanzee		Primates	XP_024204744.1	98.4
Bonobo		Primates	XP_008975653.2	88.9
House Mouse		Rodentia	NP_796179.1	40.9
Cattle		Artiodactyla	NP_001026925.1	36.6
Sunda Flying Lemur		Dermoptera	XP_008567908.1	39.4
Chinese Tree Shrew		Scandentia	XP_027622332.1	35.8
Cougar		Carnivora	XP_025768111.1	41.7
Chicken	Birds	Galliformes	XP_024998437.2	32.8
Rock Pigeon		Columbiformes	XP_013226562.2	35.7
Hooded Crow		Passeriformes	XP_039420032.1	29.9
Golden-collared Manakin		Passeriformes	XP_017934783.1	36.5
Gharial	Reptiles	Crocodilia	XP_019367354.1	36.8
Leatherback Sea Turtle		Testudines	XP_027584571.1	35.9
Chinese Softshell Turtle		Testudines	XP_006127168.1	35.2
Western Clawed Frog		Anura	NP_001039047.1	34.6
Two-lined Caecilian	Amphibians	Gymnophiona	XP_029433955.1	33.9
Asiatic Toad		Anura	XP_044137731.1	31.6
Zebrafish	Fish	Cypriniformes	NP_001313355.1	26.4
Sterlet		Acipenseriformes	XP_034760226.1	32.8
Reedfish		Polypteriformes	XP_028663678.1	32.9
Small-spotted Catshark		Carcharhiniformes	XP_038629468.1	28.0
Whale Shark		Orectolobiformes	XP_020381962.1	32.9

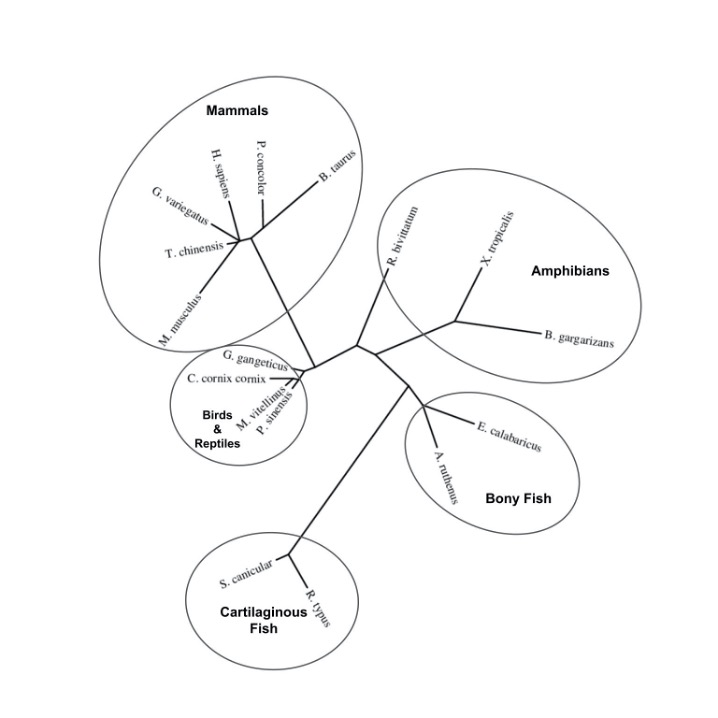
Unrooted phylogenetic tree of C1orf159 orthologs generated by Phylogeny.fr.

=== Evolutionary History ===
When compared with the evolution rate with cytochrome c and fibrinogen alpha, the C1orf159 protein has a similar evolutionary rate of change to the fast-evolving fibrinogen alpha protein, C1orf159 protein has a relatively fast evolution rate.

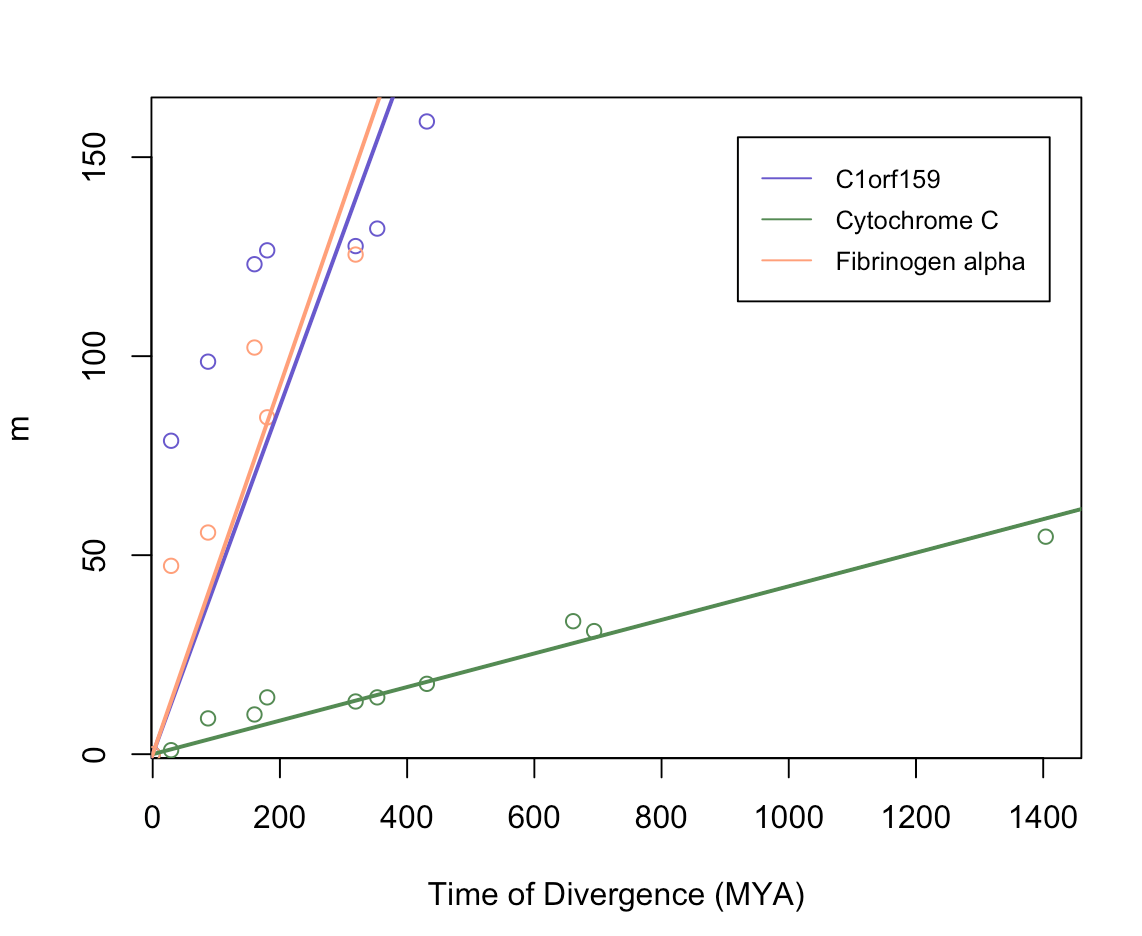
Evolutionary change of C1orf159 protein compared to the change of Cytochrome C and Fibrinogen Alpha. m in the vertical axis is defined as the total number of amino acid changes occurred in a 100-amino acid segment of a protein.

== Clinical Significance ==
The Human Protein Atlas shows that C1orf159 is an unfavorable prognosis marker for renal and liver cancer, and a favorable prognosis marker for urothelial cancer, indicating that a high expression of C1orf159 is associated with a lower survival probability for patients with renal and liver cancer, and is associated with a higher survival probability for patients with urothelial cancer.
