= NLR =

NLR may refer to:

== Places ==
- National Library of Russia, Saint Petersburg
- North Little Rock, Arkansas

== Medicine ==
- Neutrophil to lymphocyte ratio, a marker of subclinical inflammation
- Nucleotide-binding leucine-rich repeat receptor/NOD-like receptor, a family of intracellular immunoreceptors

== Rail transport ==
- Newark Light Rail, New Jersey, U.S.
- Newcastle Light Rail, Newcastle, New South Wales, Australia
- North London Railway
- Northampton and Lamport Railway, England
- Northern Latitudinal Railway, a railway in Russia

== Other uses ==
- National Laboratory of the Rockies, formerly the National Renewable Energy Laboratory (NREL).
- National LambdaRail, a high-speed computer network
- Nazi Lowriders, a white prison and criminal organization
- New Left Review, a political academic journal
- Royal Netherlands Aerospace Centre
