= Dunphy's sign =

Abdominal pain upon coughing, indicative of appendicitis

- Differential diagnosis: Appendicitis

Dunphy's sign is a medical sign characterized by increased abdominal pain with coughing. It may be an indicator of appendicitis. Named after Osborne Joby Dunphy (1898–1989), a British-American physician.
