= Epiploic appendagitis =

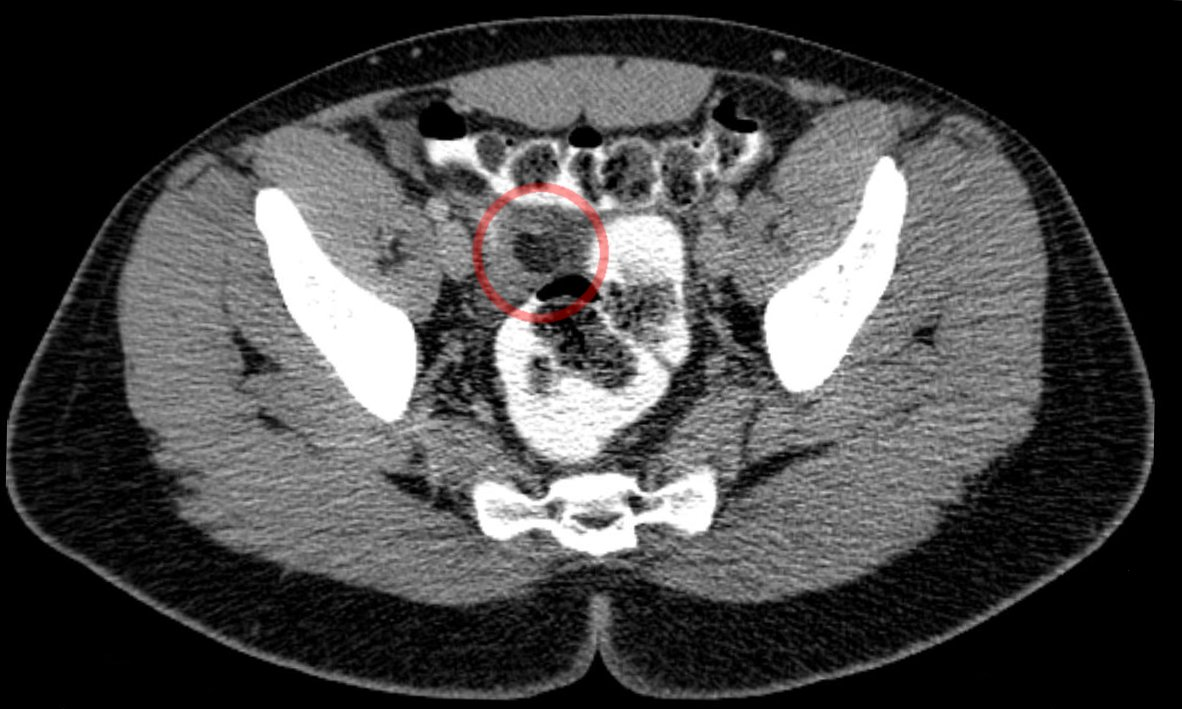

Epiploic appendagitis (EA) is an uncommon, benign, self-limiting inflammatory process of the epiploic appendices. Other, older terms for the process include appendicitis epiploica and appendagitis, but these terms are used less now in order to avoid confusion with acute appendicitis.

Epiploic appendices are small, fat-filled sacs or finger-like projections along the surface of the upper and lower colon and rectum. They may become acutely inflamed as a result of torsion (twisting) or venous thrombosis. The inflammation causes pain, often described as sharp or stabbing, located on the left, right, or central regions of the abdomen. There is sometimes nausea and vomiting. The symptoms may mimic those of acute appendicitis, diverticulitis, or cholecystitis. The pain is characteristically intense during/after defecation or micturition (espec. in the sigmoid type) due to the effect of traction on the pedicle of the lesion caused by straining and emptying of the bowel and bladder. Initial lab studies are usually normal. EA is usually diagnosed incidentally on CT scan which is performed to exclude more serious conditions.

Although it is self-limiting, epiploic appendagitis can cause severe pain and discomfort. It is usually thought to be best treated with an anti-inflammatory and a moderate to severe pain medication (depending on the case) as needed. Surgery is not recommended in nearly all cases. Sand and colleagues, however, recommend laparoscopic surgery to excise the inflamed appendage in most cases in order to prevent recurrence.

== Signs and symptoms ==
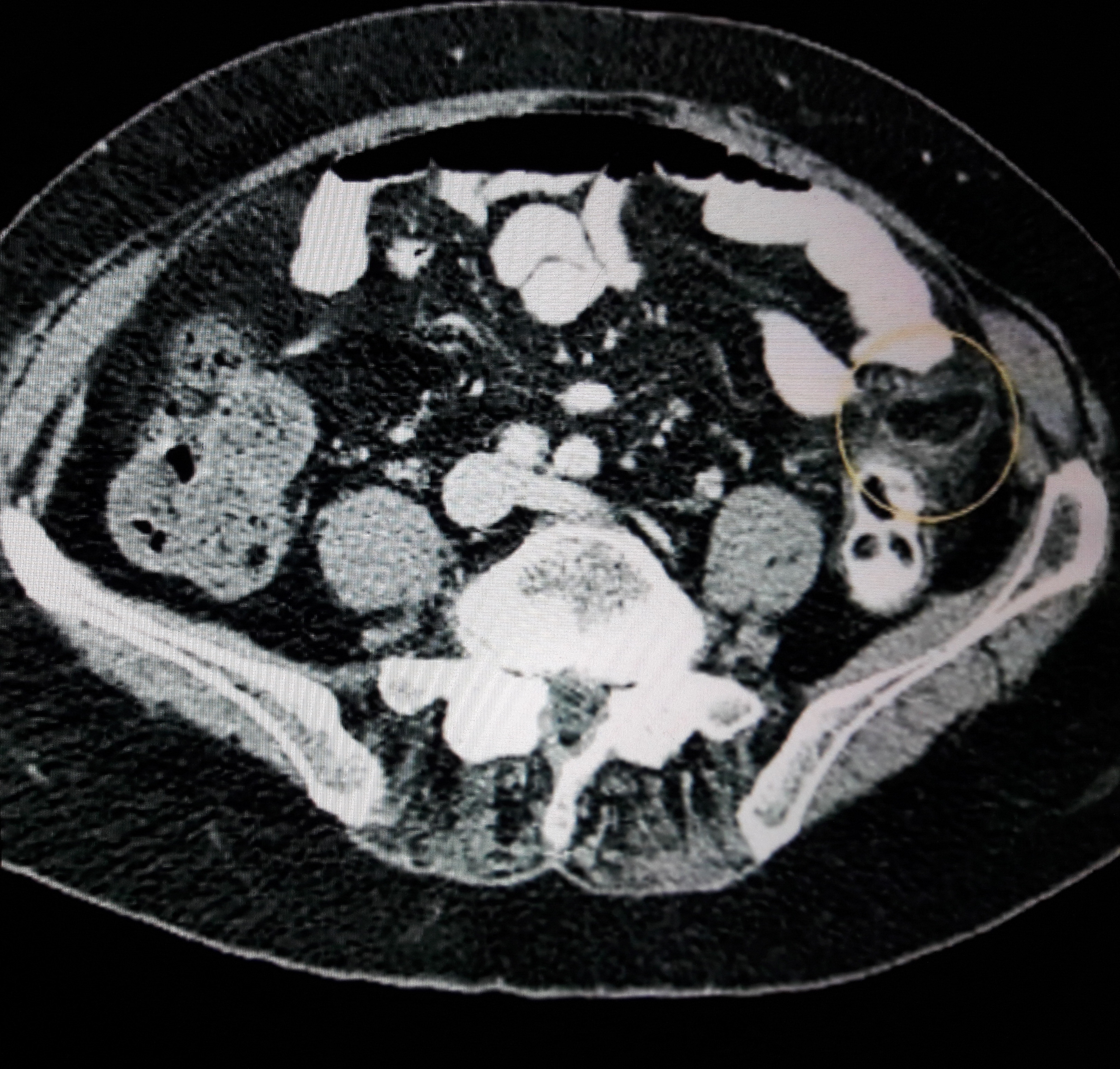
Abdominal CT scan, Epiploic Appendagitis (circle)

The condition commonly occurs in patients in their 40s and 50s predominantly in men. Epiploic appendagitis is normally misdiagnosed in most patients. Epiploic appendagitis presents with an acute onset of pain, commonly in the left lower quadrant the symptoms often lead to a misdiagnosis for diverticulitis. Diverticulitis manifests with evenly distributed lower abdominal pain accompanied with nausea, fever, and leukocytosis. Patients with acute epiploic appendagitis do not normally report a change in bowel habits, while a small number may have constipation or diarrhea.

== Peritoneal loose body ==
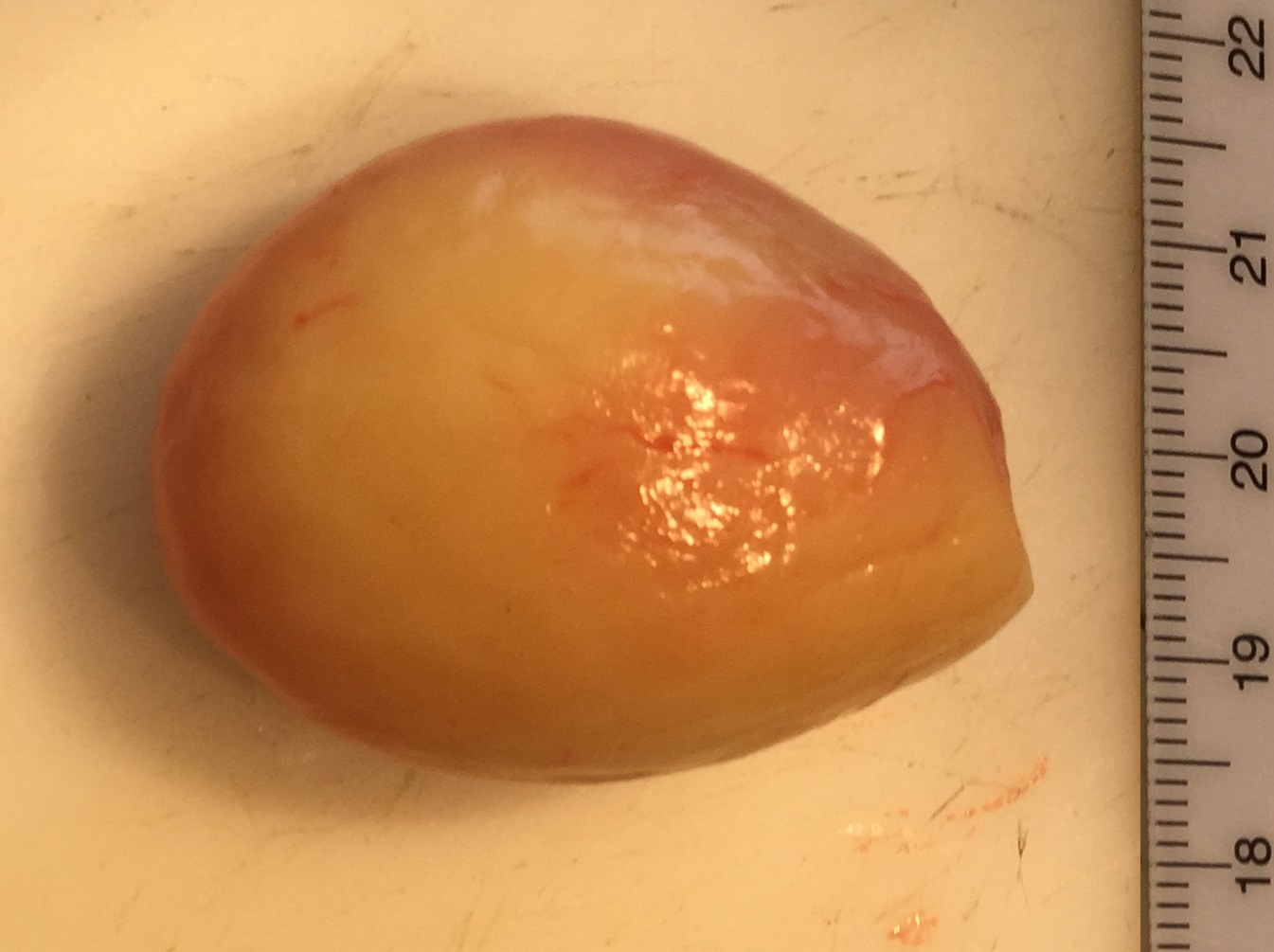
Gross pathology of a peritoneal loose body, caused torsion and autoamputation of an epiploic appendage, which eventually becomes embedded in a fibrous capsule.

It is rare however possible for epiploic appendagitis to result in a peritoneal loose body. Peritoneal loose body is a free floating mass of dead fibrous tissue surrounded by several layers of calcification (deposit of calcium salts). The loose body is the result of torsed, infarcted or detached epiploic appendages that eventually become fibrotic (inflammation and scarring) masses. If the loose body becomes large enough it can cause urinary retention (inability to empty bladder) or bowel obstructions.

=== Background ===
Epiploic appendages are also called appendices epiploicae. The appendages themselves are 50–100 appendages that are oriented in two rows anterior and posterior. The appendages are parallel to the superficial section of the taenia coli. Furthermore, the appendages are between 0.5 and 5 cm long, each appendage is attached with one or two arterioles and a venule within vascular stalks attached to the colon. Torsion (twisting or wrenching motion) of the appendages can cause ischemia which can cause painful symptoms that mimic other conditions such as diverticulitis, and appendicitis; however, it is rare. The pain associated with the inflamed appendages is located in the left and sometimes in the right lower abdominal quadrant. Diagnosis of epiploic appendagitis can be challenging due to its infrequency.

== Diagnosis ==
Epiploic appendagitis is more common in patients older than 40 years of age; however, it can occur at any age. "The reported ages range from 12 to 82 years. Men are slightly more affected than women." Patients with epiploic appendagitis describe having a localized, strong, non-migratory sharp pain after eating. Patients generally have tender abdomens as a symptom. Symptoms do not include fever, vomiting, or leukocytosis. The pain is typically located in the right or left lower abdominal quadrant. When there is pain in the right lower quadrant, it can mimic appendicitis; however, it more commonly mimics diverticulitis, with pain present on the left side.

=== Differential diagnosis ===
There are several conditions that mimic the symptoms of epiploic appendicitis.

Omental infarction: Omental infarction is uncommon reason for acute abdomen. It is similar to acute appendicitis. The pain is of a few days duration centering in the right lower or upper quadrant. Imaging is required to obtain an accurate diagnosis due to the common misdiagnosis of omental infarction as appendicitis or cholecystitis. Omental infarction occurs commonly in pediatric patients approximately 15 percent of cases. The most frequent cause of non- torsion related omental infarction is due to trauma as well as thrombosis or the omental veins. The predisposition for omental infarction includes obesity, strenuous activity, congestive heart failure, digitalis administration, recent abdominal surgery and trauma. "The typical CT findings are a solitary large non-enhancing omental mass with heterogeneous attenuation, which is most often located in the right lower quadrant, deep to the rectus abdominis muscle and either anterior to the transverse colon or anteromedial to the ascending colon". Omental Infarction can be difficult to differentiate from diverticulitis however omental infarction is not normally attributed with bowel wall thickening. It is rare that the colonic wall will be thickened due to spread of the inflammation from the omentum (a fold of peritoneum connecting or supporting abdominal structures) to the tenia omentalis of the colon.

Diverticulitis: Diverticulitis normally happens in older patients than in epiploic appendagitis. The two inflammatory conditions are quite indistinguishable based on physical manifestations. Patients with diverticulitis will present with nausea, vomiting, fever, elevated leukocyte count, rebound tenderness, and will have more extensive lower abdominal pain than patients with epiploic appendagitis. Additionally inflammation from diverticulitis may spread to the epiploic appendages making it difficult to diagnose, for inflammation of the appendices epiploicae may be resultant to other inflammatory conditions in the colonic wall and surrounding mesocolon.

=== Radiologic evaluation ===
Ultrasound and CT scans are the normal means of positive diagnosis of epiploic appendagitis. Ultrasound scans show "an oval, non-compressible hyperechoic mass with a subtle hypoechoic rim directly under the site of maximum tenderness". Normally, epiploic appendages cannot be seen on CT scan. After cross-sectional imaging and the increased use of abdominal CT for evaluating lower abdominal pain, EA is increasingly diagnosed. Pathognomonic CT scan data represent EA as 2–4 cm, oval shaped, fat density lesions, surrounded by inflammation. Contrasting with diverticulitis findings, the colonic wall is mostly unchanged.

== Management ==
Epiploic appendagitis is self-limiting and can be managed conservatively with NSAIDs.

== Epidemiology ==
Acute epiploic appendagitis is usually associated with obesity, hernia and unaccustomed exercise. The inflammation of the epiploic appendages normally resolves on its own for most patients. It is possible however uncommon for acute epiploic appendagitis to result in adhesion, bowel obstruction, intussusception, intraperitoneal loose body, peritonitis, and/or abscess formation. Treatment consists of reassurance of the patient and analgesics. Under non invasive treatment, symptoms resolve in two weeks. Hospitalization is not necessary.
