= Bartomier-Michelson's sign =

- Differential diagnosis: appendicitis

Bartomier-Michelson's sign is a medical sign characterized by increased pain on palpation at the right iliac region as the person being examined lies on their left side compared to when they lie on their back.

It helps in detection of appendicitis.
