= Fecalith =

Bodily stone made of feces

- Other names: Fecolith, coprolith, stercolith
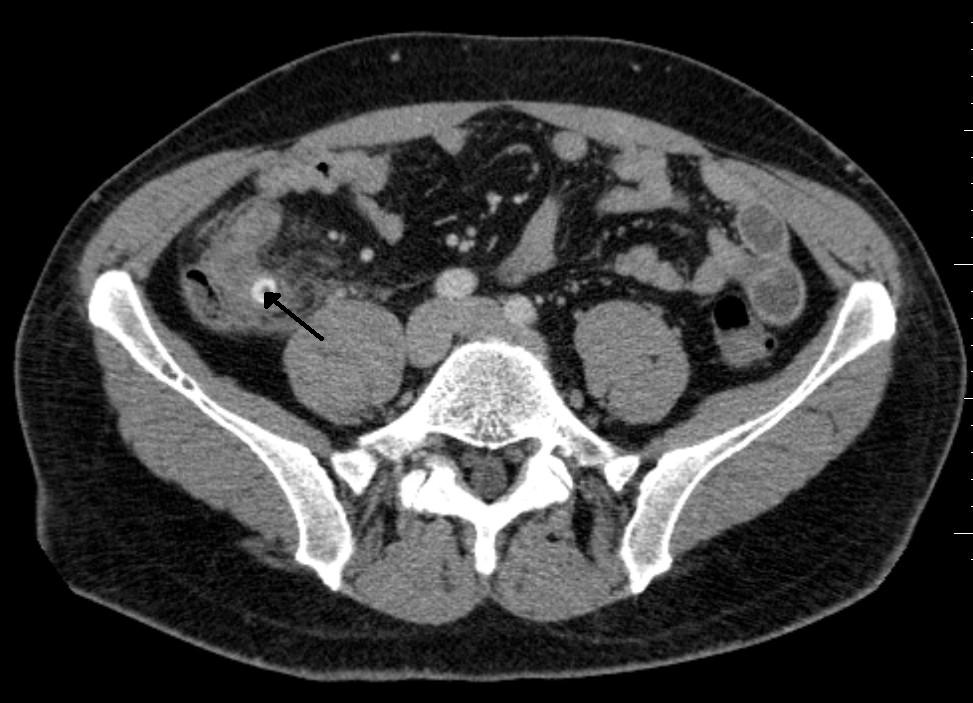
- A fecalith marked by the arrow which has resulted in acute appendicitis
- Specialty: General surgery

A fecalith is a stone made of feces. It is a hardening of feces into lumps of varying size and may occur anywhere in the intestinal tract but is typically found in the colon. It is also called appendicolith when it occurs in the appendix and is sometimes concurrent with appendicitis. They can also obstruct diverticula. It can form secondary to fecal impaction. A fecaloma is a more severe form of fecal impaction, and a hardened fecaloma may be considered a giant fecalith. The term combines the Latin word faex (sediment) with the Greek word líthos (stone).

== Diagnosis ==
- CT scan
- Projectional radiography
- Ultrasound

== Complications ==
A small fecalith is one cause of both appendicitis and acute diverticulitis.

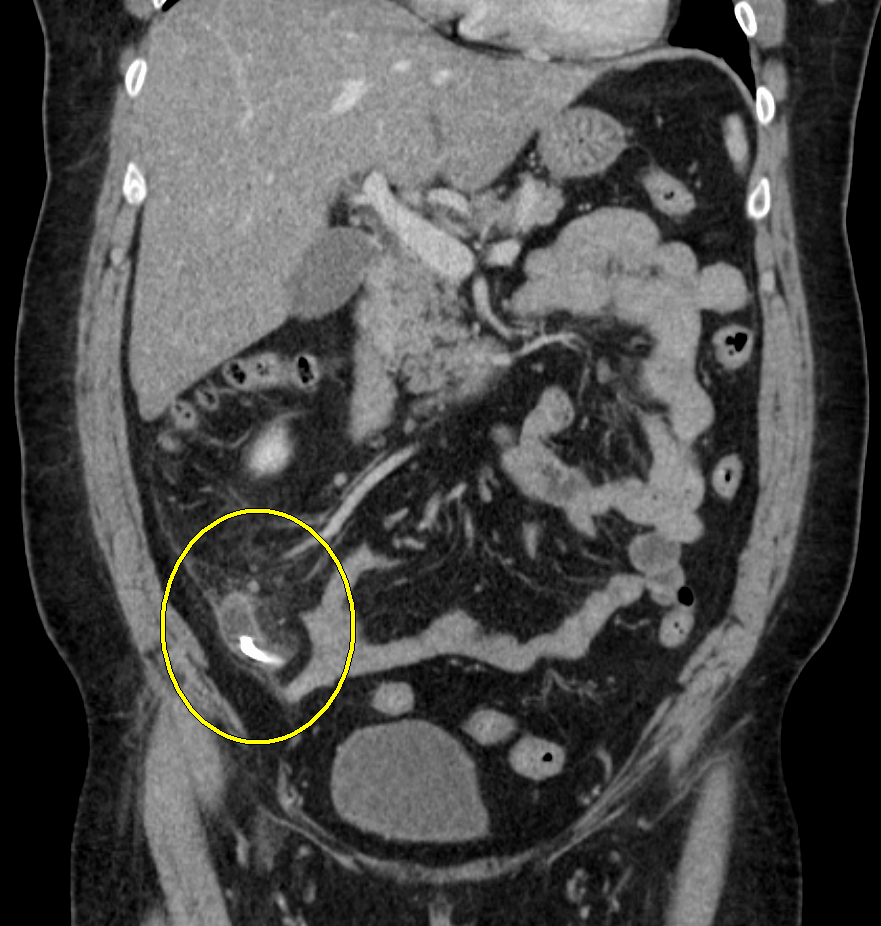
Appendicolith as seen on CT

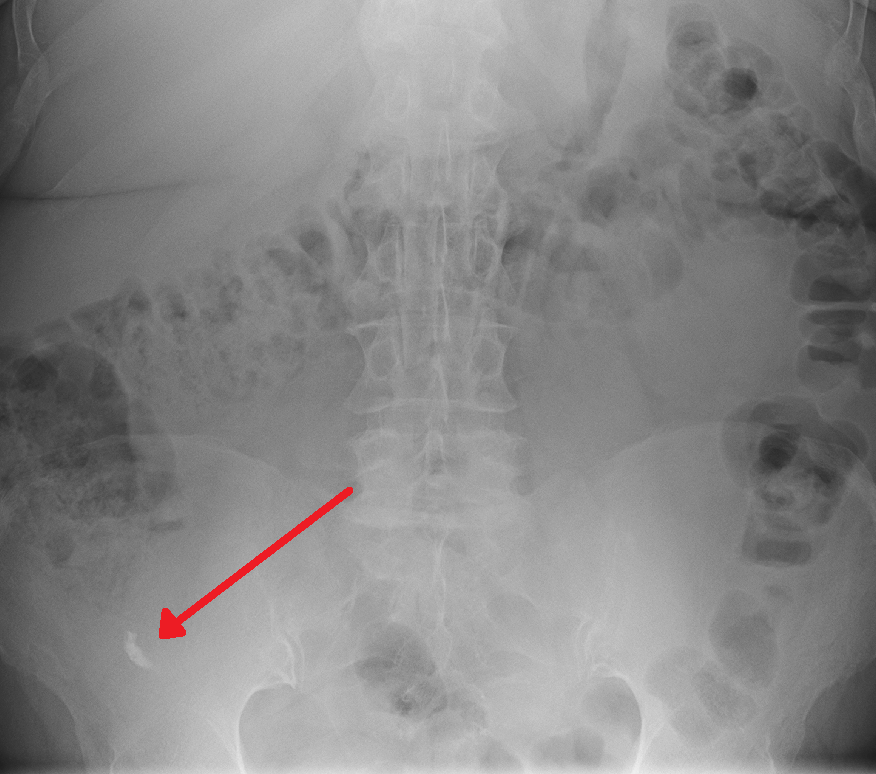
Appendicolith as seen on plain X-ray

== See also ==
- Bezoar
- Fecal impaction, including fecaloma
- Coprolith is also used to mean geologically fossilized feces.
