= Massouh's sign =

Massouh's sign is a clinical sign for acute localised appendicitis, named after General Surgeon Farouk Massouh from Frimley Park Hospital in Frimley (Surrey, the United Kingdom).

The sign describes a firm swish of the examiner’s index and middle finger across the patient’s abdomen from xiphoid sternum to first the left and then the right iliac fossa. A positive Massouh sign is a grimace of the patient upon a right sided (and not left) sweep. The explanation for the reliability of this diagnostic tool is based on the fact that appendicitis in the initial stage usually causes localised irritation of the peritoneum. The well innervated peritoneum is very sensitive to pain and therefore sensitive to jouncing movements. Similarly this is the explanation for other signs of localised peritonitis such as Murphy's sign, Rovsing's sign or psoas sign.

There is currently no published evidence on the sensitivity or specificity of Massouh sign for suspected acute appendicitis.
