= Neutrophil to lymphocyte ratio =

Prognostic marker

The neutrophil to lymphocyte ratio (NLR) reflects systemic inflammation, which plays an important role in the process of treating ischemic strokes.

In medicine neutrophil to lymphocyte ratio (NLR) is used to show there is inflammation in the body. It is calculated by dividing the number of neutrophils by number of lymphocytes, usually from peripheral blood sample, but sometimes also from cells that infiltrate tissue, such as tumor. Recently Lymphocyte Monocyte ratio (LMR) has also been studied as a marker of inflammation including tuberculosis and various cancers.

== Uses ==
=== Prognostic biomarker in acute ischemic stroke (AIS) ===
The NLR is associated with stroke severity, unfavorable functional outcomes and mortality in AIS.

=== Prognosis of cardiovascular diseases ===
Higher NLR contributes to predicting mortality rates (prognostic marker) in patients undergoing certain medical procedures, such as angiography or cardiac revascularization.

=== Prognostic marker in cancer ===
Increased NLR is associated with poor prognosis of various cancers, such as esophageal, liver, ovarian, pancreatic, prostate and stomach cancer.

=== Prognostic marker in COVID-19 ===
NLR can be used as a prognostic marker for COVID-19 given the significant difference of NLR between those died and recovered from COVID-19.

== Reference values ==
A 2017 study found that the normal NLR range for healthy adults is between 0.78 and 3.53.

== History ==
Neutrophil to Lymphocyte ratio was first demonstrated as useful parameter after a correlation of a relationship between the neutrophil lymphocyte ratio to reactions of the immune response was noted. A study in 2001 was conducted by the Department of Anaesthesiology and Intensive Care Medicine, St. Elizabeth Cancer Institute in Bratislava by Zahorec which suggested the routine use of the ratio as a stress factor in clinical ICU practice in intervals of 6-12 and 24 hours.

The first study to demonstrate that pre-therapeutic NLR can be used as a predictor of chemotherapy sensitivity to thoracic esophageal cancer was demonstrated by Hiroshi Sato, Yasuhiro Tsubosa, and Tatsuyuki Kawano in a 2012 study published in the World Journal of Surgery.
