= Aure-Rozanova's sign =

- Differential diagnosis: Retrocecal appendix (its position)

Aure-Rozanova's sign is a medical sign that is typically seen in retrocecal appendix. It is characterized by increased pain on palpation with finger in the right Petit triangle (can be a positive Shchetkin-Boomberg's sign).
