= Prognosis marker =

Medical term

Prognostic markers are biomarkers used to measure the progress of a disease in the patient sample. Prognostic markers are useful to stratify the patients into groups, guiding towards precise medicine discovery. The widely used prognostic markers in cancers include stage, size, grade, node and metastasis. In addition to these common markers, there are prognostic markers specific to different cancer types. For example estrogen level, progesterone and HER2 are markers specific to breast cancer patients. There is evidence showing that genes behaving as tumor suppressors or carcinogens could act as prognostic markers due to altered gene expression or mutation. Besides genetic biomarkers, there are also biomarkers that are detected in plasma or body fluid which can be metabolic or protein biomarkers.

== Traditional markers ==
Traditional prognostic markers in oncology include tumor size, staging, lymph node spreading status, and metastasis. Large tumor, late staging, presence of cancer cells in multiple distant lymph nodes, and observation of metastasis often associate with poor prognosis.

== Molecular markers ==
In recent years, advances in molecular techniques, genomics, cancer biology and sequencing technology have provided opportunities to discover and validate new biomarkers for prognosis, particularly molecular prognostic markers. The newly developed prognostic biomarker can roughly be divided into DNA, epigenetic, RNA, signaling pathway, protein, and metabolic tumor biomarkers.

=== DNA markers ===
Carcinogenesis involves critical mutations on genes regulating cell cycle checkpoints which cause a normal cell to grow in an uncontrolled manner and thus DNA marker provide the first-hand information on carcinogenesis. DNA markers tend to be cancer type-specific, for instance, FLT3 mutations in acute myeloid leukemia, BRCA mutations in breast cancer, BRAF mutations in melanoma, and FGFR3 mutations in bladder cancer. Detection of cancer hotspot mutations are made feasible by the advance of next-generation sequencing (NGS) that offers high-throughput sequencing of target amplicons.

Table1: DNA prognostic markers for common cancer types

Cancer	DNA markers
Thyroid cancer	RET-PTC, NTRK1, PTEN, TP53, PI3K, AKT, CTNNB1, PAX8, RAS, BRAF, TSHR
Bladder cancer	FGFR3, TERT, STAG2, AURKA
Ovarian cancer	TP53, WT1, Ki67, Topo-II, BRCA1, BRCA2
Cervical cancer	Ki67, MYC, p16INK4a, PTEN, Bm-3a
Breast cancer	BRCA1, BRCA2, HER-2, TP53, EGFR
Prostate cancer	GSTP1, MYC, PTEN, APC, PCA3, PSMA, AMACR, BRCA1, BRCA2
Colorectal cancer	KRAS, BRAF, PIK3CA, TP53, APC, SFRP2, ITGA4, GATA4, GATA5, OSMR

For liquid tumors, sufficient amount of DNA could be easily obtained since blood draw from patient is simple and noninvasive; for solid tumors, needle biopsy is often performed to collect tumor DNA, a process more invasive with limited DNA quantity for downstream analysis. An alternative DNA source is circulating tumor DNA (ctDNA). ctDNA primarily originates from apoptotic and necrotic tumor cells that release their fragmented DNA into the circulation. It is believed that the amount of ctDNA in plasma is correlated with tumor progression and thus it has the potential to be utilized as a cancer prognostic marker. Collection of ctDNA is less invasive compared to tumor biopsy in that only a blood draw is need. But the challenge lies in extraction of ctDNA from total blood, the DNA quantity obtained, and methods to analyze highly fragmented ctDNA.

=== Epigenetic markers ===
Epigenetics are inheritable changes in gene expression that are not caused by alterations in DNA sequence. One of the most frequently seen prognostic markers is DNA methylation, primarily methylation of CpG islands, where cytosines in CpG dinucleotides can be methylated to form 5-methylcytosines. A panel of epigenetic methylation marker has been explored for prognosis of ovarian cancer, and it is reported that the panel exhibited high specificity and sensitivity (both above 70%) as a screen marker. Epigenetic markers have also shown promising potential as prognostic markers for bladder cancer.

=== RNA markers ===
While DNA sequence infers what the cells could possibly do, the expression profile indicates what is actually being done at a particular time point. Whether specific mRNA molecules exist and the degree at which they are expressed suggest whether a certain gene is “on” and its expression level. Therefore, mRNA profiling could provide downstream transcriptional information about cancer in a more detailed and more timely manner. Technologies for mRNA profiling include RT-qPCR for highly sensitive analysis of few mRNA targets, microarrays for multiplexing profiling up to whole transcriptome level, and next generation RNA sequencing, i.e., RNA-seq, for analysis of all RNA molecules within a cancer cell (alternative splicing variants, mRNAs, noncoding RNAs and microRNAs).

mRNA profiling panels have been established for breast cancer and other cancers as well. A set of 97-mRNA profile has achieved satisfactory molecular grading of breast cancer and has been commercialized as the MapQuant Dx Genomic Grade assay.

=== Protein markers ===
The technique used for identifying protein markers is immunohistochemistry (IHC). IHC staining of the intended protein markers are performed on tumor tissues and stained tissue would demonstrate the presence and distribution of the intended protein markers. The advantage of this technology is that it could provide morphological information about protein expression levels and the procedures are standardized and of low cost. However, assessment of IHC-stained tissue is less quantitative and are subject to bias. Besides, the number of validated protein markers for a certain type of cancer is limited.

=== Metabolic markers ===
Metabolites are potentially useful for predicting treatment response since they are the endpoint of many molecular pathways. For example, Sreekumar et al reported that the level of sarcosine, which is a derivative of glycine, in the urine of men is correlated with metastasis of prostate cancer.
