= Drugs for acid-related disorders =

There are several classes of drugs for acid-related disorders, such as dyspepsia, peptic ulcer disease (PUD), gastroesophageal reflux disease (GORD/GERD), or laryngopharyngeal reflux.

The World Health Organization gives drugs in these classes the categorization code ATC code A02.

== H_{2} antagonists ==
The H_{2} receptor antagonists are a class of drugs used to block the action of histamine on parietal cells in the stomach, decreasing the production of acid by these cells. H_{2} antagonists are used in the treatment of dyspepsia, although they have been surpassed in popularity by the more effective proton pump inhibitors. H_{2} receptor blockers lead to roughly a 40% improvement.

H_{2} receptor antagonists are named using the suffix "-tidine".

== Proton-pump inhibitors ==
Proton-pump inhibitors (PPIs) are a group of drugs whose main action is a pronounced and long-lasting reduction of gastric acid production. They are the most potent inhibitors of acid secretion available. The group followed and has largely superseded another group of pharmaceuticals with similar effects, but a different mode of action, called H_{2}-receptor antagonists. These drugs are among the most widely sold drugs in the world, and are generally considered effective. When these medications are used long term, the lowest effective dose should be taken. They may also be taken only when symptoms occur in those with frequent problems.

Proton-pump inhibitors are named using the suffix "-prazole".

There is a purported correlation (but no proven causal link) between the use of PPIs and the risk of dementia. However, this remain controversial as chronic and co-morbid pathology, and resultant polypharmacy (including increased consumption of PPIs), will probably itself also give rise to an increased risk of dementia as a whole.

Three large epidemiological studies (two in Germany and one in Taiwan) showed that long-term exposure to PPIs may increase the risk of developing dementia in the elderly. Conversely, two other large studies (one in Finland and one in the United States), found no association between the use of PPIs and the risk of Alzheimer's dementia. Several systematic review and meta-analysis suggest that there is no association between PPIs use and increased risk of dementia or Alzheimer's Dementia.

== Prostaglandins ==
A prostaglandin is any member of a group of lipid compounds that are derived enzymatically from fatty acids and have important functions in the animal body. Every prostaglandin contains 20 carbon atoms, including a 5-carbon ring.

They are mediators and have a variety of strong physiological effects, such as regulating the contraction and relaxation of smooth muscle tissue. There are many prostaglandins with many effects. Prostaglandin E2 has effects including reducing gastric acid and increasing gastric mucus, which among other effects treat acid-related disorders.

Prostaglandins are named using the root term "-prost-".

== Other drugs ==
Other drugs which have been used to treat acid-related disorders are not part of the above categories and function through a variety of mechanisms.

== Alternative methods for reducing acid production ==
- Helicobacter pylori eradication protocols

== Availability of drugs ==
Availability of drugs for acid-related disorders
drug	class	Examples of countries where some dosages are available without prescription	Examples of countries where available in generic form
Omeprazole	PPI	United States	United States
Lansoprazole	PPI	United States	
Omeprazole/sodium bicarbonate	PPI	United States	
Pantoprazole	PPI		United States
Ranitidine	H2 antagonist	United States	
Famotidine (only 10 mg)	H2 antagonist	Russian Federation	
Ranitidine (both 75 and 150 mg)	H2 antagonist	Russian Federation	Russian Federation

In the United States, all four FDA-approved members of the group—cimetidine, ranitidine, famotidine, and nizatidine—are available over the counter in relatively low doses.
