= Chemoreceptor trigger zone =

Area of the brain

The chemoreceptor trigger zone (CTZ) is an area of the medulla oblongata that receives inputs from blood-borne drugs or hormones, and communicates with other structures in the vomiting center to initiate vomiting. The CTZ is located within the area postrema, which is on the floor of the fourth ventricle and is functionally outside the typical blood–brain barrier, allowing it to detect circulating emetic stimuli more readily. It is also part of the vomiting center itself. The neurotransmitters implicated in the control of nausea and vomiting include acetylcholine, dopamine, histamine (H1 receptor), substance P (NK-1 receptor), and serotonin (5-HT3 receptor). There are also opioid receptors present, which may be involved in the mechanism by which opiates cause nausea and vomiting. Because the area postrema has a reduced or absent typical blood–brain barrier, drugs such as dopamine that do not usually cross easily into the CNS may still stimulate the CTZ.

== Evolutionary significance ==
The CTZ is in the medulla oblongata, which is phylogenetically the oldest part of the central nervous system. Early lifeforms developed a brainstem, or inner brain, and nothing more. This part of the brain is responsible for basic survival instincts and reactions, for example to make an organism turn its head and look where an auditory stimulus was heard. The brainstem is where the medulla is located, and therefore also the area postrema and the CTZ. Then later lifeforms developed another segment of the brain, which includes the limbic system. This area of the brain is responsible for producing emotion and emotional responses to external stimuli, and also is significantly involved in memory and reward systems. Evolutionarily, the cerebral cortex is the most recent development. This area of the brain is responsible for critical thinking and reasoning, and is actively involved in decision making. It has been discovered that a major cause of increased intelligence in species including humans is the increase in cortical neurons in the brain. The emetic response was selected for protective purposes, and serves as a safeguard against poisoning of the body. This response gets toxins and drugs out of the body by summoning control over motor neurons which stimulate muscles in the chest and thoracic diaphragm to expel contents from the stomach.

== Chemoreception ==
Since the CTZ is located in the area postrema, a sensory circumventricular organ, it does not have a blood–brain barrier. This means that large polar molecules, such as emetic toxins, can diffuse through to and reach the CTZ quite easily. This is because the medulla oblongata is located in the area of the brain, the most inferior portion, which does not have a robust and highly developed blood-brain barrier. Without this barrier, emetic drugs and toxins are free to interact with a receptor, or multiple receptors located in the CTZ. These receptors in the CTZ are called chemoreceptors because they interact with different types of molecules which are usually referred to as neurotransmitters. These neurotransmitters implement their effects on the CTZ receptors by binding to them which sets off a chain of events that produces an action potential. Studies have shown that neurons in the CTZ increase their rate of firing when exposed to emetic substances.

The CTZ has many different types of receptors, which are specific to different types of toxins or drugs that might be present in the bloodstream and thus that can affect the CTZ. Types of CTZ receptors include dopamine, serotonin, histamine, substance P, opioid, and acetylcholine receptors. It has been discovered that the cholinergic neurons are actually nicotinic. These receptors are meant to monitor the amount of associated neurotransmitter of these receptors in the blood. For instance, the CTZ has opioid receptors that monitor the level of opioids in the blood, and when the amount of opioids in the blood reaches a certain level, the opioid receptors in the CTZ will signal to the rest of the vomiting center to initiate vomiting. This is because the CTZ sends the "vomit" command through action potentials, and these specific action potentials that trigger emesis are only produced when a certain amount of opioids bind to a certain amount of opioid receptors in the CTZ. Neurons in the CTZ, and area postrema in general, actually have two types of receptors: those at the surface of the neuron and those that are located deeper down in the dendrites.

The receptors on the surface of the neuron are chemoreceptors that are activated from direct contact of emetic substances in the blood, whereas the receptors that are deeper down on the dendrites are receptors that are activated in response to the activated chemoreceptors on the surface.

== Communication ==
The vomiting center of the brain refers to the groups of loosely organized neurons in the medulla that include the CTZ within the area postrema and the nucleus tractus solitarii. One of the ways the chemoreceptor trigger zone implements its effects on the vomiting center is by activation of the opioid mu receptors and delta receptors. The activation of these opioid receptors in the CTZ are especially important for patients who take opioid based pain medications on a regular basis. However, opioids do not play a role in communication to the vomiting center of the brain, they only induce communication. Dopamine and serotonin have been found to play the biggest role in communication from the CTZ to the remainder of the vomiting center, as well as histamine. Chemoreceptors in the CTZ relay information about the presence of emetic agents in the blood to the adjacent nucleus tractus solitarii (NTS). The relaying happens by the initiation of an action potential, which is caused by the chemoreceptor causing a change in electric potential in the neuron it is embedded in, which then subsequently causes an action potential. This happens constantly, so the chemoreceptors in the CTZ are continually sending information about how much emetic agents are in the blood, even when emesis is not signaled for. The NTS is organized into subnuclei that direct many different functions relating to swallowing, gastric sensation, laryngeal and pharyngeal sensation, baroreceptor function, and respiration. The NTS directs signals about these functions to a central pattern generator (CPG). This CPG actually coordinates the sequences of physical movements during emesis. The main neurotransmitters involved in communication between the CTZ and remaining vomiting center are serotonin, dopamine, histamine, and endogenous opioids which include endorphins, enkephalins, dynorphin.

The CTZ communicates with the other parts of the vomiting center through neurons that contain 5-HT_{3}, D_{2}, H_{1} and H_{2} receptors. It has been seen that intraventricular administration of histamine in dogs causes an emetic response. This shows that histamine plays a significant role in signaling for emetic action in the CTZ. Some classes of molecules have been shown to inhibit the emetic response due to histamine, these include mepyramine, burimamide and metiamide.

=== Phosphodiesterases ===
Recent studies have found that phosphodiesterase 4 (PDE4) inhibitors, such as Rolipram, cause emesis as one of their side effects. It has been found that these PDE4 isoforms are expressed in the CTZ and in the brainstem in general. The mRNA products from genes that code for these PDE4 isoforms are plentiful in the CTZ, and not only located in CTZ neurons, but also in glial cells and blood vessels associated with the CTZ neurons. PDE4 mRNAs are transcribed more in the area postrema and the CTZ than anywhere else in the brainstem. The PDE4 degrades the phosphodiester bonds in the second messenger molecule cyclic adenosine monophosphate (cAMP), which is one of the ways the brain relays information. By modifying cAMP signaling in the CTZ, it is thought that this could mediate the emetic effects of PDE4 inhibitors in the CTZ.

=== H-channels ===
Most of the neurons located in the CTZ express hyperpolarization-activated cation channels (H-channels). Since the neurons in the CTZ convey information relating to emesis to the other parts of the vomiting center, it was thought that these H-channels might play a role in nausea and the emetic response. Recently, evidence of this notion that H-channels in CTZ neurons play a role in emesis has come to light. It has been found that ZD7288, which is a H-channel inhibitor, inhibited the acquisition of conditioned taste aversion (CTA) in rats and reduced apomorphine-induced c-Fos expression in the area postrema where the CTZ is located. This suggests that the neurons that express H-channels in the CTZ and area postrema are involved in nausea and the emetic response.

== The vomiting center of the brain ==
This integrates the emetic response. This is the area in which "a final decision is made" about whether to evoke an emetic response. This decision is based heavily on the information which the CTZ relays to the rest of the vomiting center, but also the chemoreceptors in the GI tract, the information sent to the vomiting center by the vestibular system, and higher order centers located in the cortex. The vomiting center is not a discrete or specific place in the brain, but rather an area consisting of many nuclei, axons, and receptors that together cause the physical changes necessary to induce vomiting. Also, emesis can occur by direct neural stimulation of the vomiting center.

== Damage to the CTZ ==
Damage to the CTZ can come via stroke, physical injury, or over-excitation resulting in neuron death. Once the damage has occurred, the effects can cause the emetic response to disappear, or cause the emetic response to heighten, in some cases causing intractable vomiting that leave patients in severe distress. In cases such as these, if the damage is severe enough, little can be done to inhibit an intractable vomiting response because the chemoreceptors in the CTZ are physically damaged or hindered in some way. Recently, it has been discovered that physical changes in the area postrema and CTZ do cause or inhibit emesis. Specifically, compression of blood vessels which are physically located near in or around the CTZ, and that result in physical compression of the area postrema as a whole, have been found to be the cause of chronic medically intractable emesis and weight loss. Surgical microvascular decompression resulted in postoperative and long-term resolution of emesis.

== Antiemetic medications ==
Antiemetic medications often target the CTZ to completely inhibit or greatly reduce vomiting. Most of these work by not allowing certain blood-borne drugs (usually pain killers or stimulants) to bind to their respective receptors located in the CTZ. The antiemetic medications can block the binding site on a chemoreceptor in the CTZ, so that the emetic agent cannot bind to it to cause its emetic effects. Another way that antiemetic medications can work is by binding to a chemoreceptor in the CTZ, but instead of initiate vomiting, the medication can cause the receptors to send signals to the other parts of the vomiting center that inhibit emesis. Also, some anti-emetic medications work by lowering the amount of dopamine levels in the brain, which in turn effects how much dopamine comes in contact with dopamine receptors in the CTZ. Other antiemetic medications work similarly by lowering a different substance in the brain that is known to interact with chemoreceptors in the CTZ that cause emesis.

== Antiemetic drugs coupled with pain relieving medications ==
Oftentimes, doctors will "pre-treat" patients who might exhibit emetic responses due to drugs they prescribe them. Usually pain relieving drugs such as opioids are co-prescribed with anti-emetic drugs to stop the emetic response due to the pain reliever before it can even mediate its effects on the CTZ. This way, the patient does not have to worry about the doctors prescription to treat their pain causing them to be in severe discomfort via vomiting.

== Chemotherapy ==
Chemotherapy is a major cause of emesis and can trigger severe nausea and vomiting in some patients. Chemotherapy-induced nausea and vomiting occurs through several pathways, including activation of receptor systems involving serotonin (5-HT3), dopamine (D2), and substance P (NK1), with the CTZ and area postrema playing an important role in detecting circulating emetic signals. Because of this, patients receiving chemotherapy are often prescribed antiemetic medications such as 5-HT3 receptor antagonists, NK1 receptor antagonists, and corticosteroids to help prevent symptoms.

== See also ==
- Trigger zone
