= C. Robin Ganellin =

British chemist (1934–2026)

Charon Robin Ganellin
- Born: 25 January 1934; London, England
- Died: 27 June 2026 (aged 92)
- Citizenship: United Kingdom
- Education: Queen Mary College
- Known for: Cimetidine
- Scientific career
- Fields: Medicinal Chemistry
- Workplaces: University College London

Charon Robin Ganellin (25 January 1934 – 27 June 2026) was a British medicinal chemist and Smith Kline and French Professor of Medicinal Chemistry, at University College London.

Ganellin contributed much to the field of drug discovery and development. He was involved in the development of cimetidine, a drug used to combat stomach ulcers, when working at Smith Kline and French which he stated was the achievement in which he took the most pride.

== Early life ==
Ganellin was born in East London. His father and maternal uncle were chemists, which influenced his choice of profession despite a stated interest in biology and natural history. As a child, Ganellin studied at Harrow County Grammar School. He began his formal studies at Queen Mary College in London where he received his bachelor of science in chemistry. Ganellin continued studying at Queen Mary College researching tropylium chemistry with Michael J.S. Dewar where he discovered how to isolate the tropylium cation from cyclooctatetraene. Ganellin was awarded his PhD in organic chemistry in 1958 at age 24 for defending his dissertation titled "Studies in the tropylium series."

== Scientific work ==
In 1958, shortly after his PhD studies at Queen Mary College, Ganellin joined Smith Kline and French Laboratories in the UK where he began research in medicinal chemistry. Two years after starting at SK&F, he went to the Massachusetts Institute of Technology where he performed his postdoctoral work with Arthur C. Cope. At MIT, he devised the first direct optical resolution of a chiral olefin using platinum complex chemistry. After a year at MIT, he returned to the UK to resume his work at SK&F. In 1966, he headed a landmark research team at SK&F, collaborating with James Black researching histamine H2-receptor antagonists. This research eventually led to the discovery of Cimetidine, also known by its trademark name Tagamet which is currently produced by GlaxoSmith Kline. Cimetidine quickly garnered over one billion dollars in annual sales.

== Awards and achievements ==
Ganellin authored or co-authored over 260 scientific papers and is listed as inventor or co-inventor on over 160 US patents. He served as the president of the IUPAC medicinal chemistry section, and for 10 years (until 2012) he was the chair of the subcommittee on medicinal chemistry and drug development. He won many awards and commendations, both for his work on cimetidine and his research in other areas of medicinal chemistry. He received awards in medicinal chemistry from many organisations, such as the Royal Society of Chemistry, the American Chemical Society, the Society of Chemical Industry, the Society for Drug Research, the European Federation for Medicinal Chemistry, the Société Chimie Thérapeutique of France, and the Medicinal Chemistry Division of the Italian Chemical Society.

He was also inducted into the US National Inventors Hall of Fame in 1990 for his work on cimetidine.

== Death ==
Ganellin died on 27 June 2026, at the age of 92.

== Drugs list ==
[2104-81-6] Patent:

1. Icotidine
2. Impromidine
3. Cetiedil (enantiomers):
4. UCL 1608
5. Oxmetidine
6. Cimetidine
7. UCL-1439
8. Ciproxifan
9. UCL-1390
10. UCL 1684 (pharmacology)
11. Donetidine
12. Metiamide
13. Burimamide
14. 6-(4-Chlorophenyl)-2,2-dimethylpiperidin-4-one [2104-81-6] (stimulant & depressant properties):
15. 1-(2-diethylaminoethyl-2-(p-ethoxybenzyl)-2-indene (Ex 9, Nitazene type mimic): Patent:
