= Zantac =

Zantac can refer to either of two different H_{2} antagonists used to reduce gastric acid secretion:

- Ranitidine, prior to its 2020 withdrawal from the market
- Famotidine, following the withdrawal of ranitidine
