= Bismuth subcitrate =

Pharmaceutical drug

Clinical data
- Routes of administration: Oral
- ATC code: A02BX05 (WHO)

Identifiers
- IUPAC name: Bismuth(3+) potassium 2-olato-1,2,3-propanetricarboxylate (1:5:2)
- CAS Number: 880149-29-1
- PubChem CID: 91667825
- DrugBank: DB09275
- ChemSpider: 34989447
- UNII: BQE6KE1T4H
- KEGG: D09739
- ECHA InfoCard: 100.055.320

Chemical and physical data
- Formula: C_{12}H_{8}BiK_{5}O_{14}
- Molar mass: 780.654 g·mol^{−1}
- 3D model (JSmol): Interactive image
- SMILES: C(C(=O)[O-])C(CC(=O)[O-])(C(=O)[O-])[O-].C(C(=O)[O-])C(CC(=O)[O-])(C(=O)[O-])[O-].[K+].[K+].[K+].[K+].[K+].[Bi+3]
- InChI: InChI=1S/2C6H7O7.Bi.5K/c2*7-3(8)1-6(13,5(11)12)2-4(9)10;;;;;;/h2*1-2H2,(H,7,8)(H,9,10)(H,11,12);;;;;;/q2*-1;+3;5*+1/p-6; Key:YDDTTXDPCSCLKY-UHFFFAOYSA-H

Bismuth subcitrate potassium is a bismuth salt used in combination with antibiotics and a proton pump inhibitor for the treatment of Helicobacter pylori infections.

A fixed-dose combination with the antibiotics metronidazole and tetracycline is sold under the trade name Pylera.

== Side effects ==
A known side effect of bismuth salts is harmless and reversible darkening of tongue and stool by formation of bismuth sulfite. Other side effects of bismuth containing combination therapies are often difficult to assign to a specific component.

== Interactions ==
Bismuth absorption is increased by ranitidine and omeprazole.

== Pharmacology ==
=== Mechanism of action ===
The mechanism of action of bismuth is not fully known. It has been reasoned to interfere with the function of the bacterial cell membrane, protein and cell wall synthesis, the enzyme urease, cell adhesion, ATP synthesis, and iron transport mechanisms. Bismuth displaces nickel (Ni^{2+}) from active sites of the bacterial urease (UreG), and other bacterial metalloenzymes (e.g., catalase, lipase, fumarase), thereby disrupting acid-neutralization capacity and energy metabolism of H. pylori. Another possible mechanism of action is that the inhibition of bacterial enzyme result in bacterial growth arrest. Bismuth particles induce vacuolization, cell wall degradation, membrane disintegration, and loss of adherence to epithelial cells of the host: bismuth impairs bacterial adhesion to the gastric epithelium and biofilm formation.

=== Pharmacokinetics ===
Upon oral administration, bismuth subcitrate undergoes partial dissolution in the acidic gastric environment, with the majority of the dose localizing in the stomach. Although most of the dose remains unabsorbed, a small portion enters into systemic circulation, and serum concentration reaches (C_{max} at 20–30 min) 16–80 ng/mL - levels that exceed the minimum inhibitory concentration for H. pylori (1–8 μg/mL). Co-administration with proton pump inhibitors (PPI) such as omeprazole or H_{2}-antagonists such as famotidine increases serum and tissue concentrations of bismuth, possibly due to greater solubility and less rapid precipitation in less acidic gastric juice.

In the small intestine, unlike the stomach, bismuth subcitrate does not form stable binding layers or antimicrobial reservoirs. At the more alkaline pH, colloidal particles aggregate and precipitate without significant further dissolution or interaction with epithelial or microbial targets. There is no conclusive evidence for microbiological impact of bismuth in the small intestine when administered at therapeutic doses. Upon entry into the large intestine (colon), bismuth is exposed to an anaerobic, sulfur-rich environment maintained by the gut microbiota. Here, it undergoes microbial methylation and sulfide complexation, yielding species such as trimethylbismuth (TMBi) and insoluble bismuth sulfide (Bi_{2}S_{3}), which is responsible for the black coloration of stool during therapy. Despite high total bismuth concentrations in the colon, antimicrobial activity in the colon is negligible because dominant forms of bismuth recovered (insoluble bismuth sulfide and methylated derivatives like TMBi) are microbiologically inactive; transformation into bismuth sulfide not only curtails further absorption but also minimizes potential toxicity and flora disruption.

== Chemical properties ==
Bismuth subcitrate potassium is a salt of bismuth (Bi^{3+}), potassium (K^{+}) and citrate (C_{6}H_{4}O^{4−}_{7}) in a molar ratio of about 1:5:2, with 3 moles of water. It contains about 25.6% (mass percent) bismuth, which is the active moiety, and 22.9% potassium. Other sources give somewhat different ratios of the constituents.

== Research directions ==
Outside of H. pylori eradication and ulcer management, the broader antimicrobial potential and gastric‑protective roles of bismuth subcitrate are not well studied in clinical trials; this is a potential research direction. Bismuth is also studied on potential antiviral and antileishmanial applications.

== See also ==
- Helicobacter pylori eradication protocols
- Bismuth subsalicylate
