= C19H29N5O2 =

The molecular formula C_{19}H_{29}N_{5}O_{2} (molar mass: 359.46 g/mol, exact mass: 359.2321 u) may refer to:

- Gepirone
- Lavoltidine (Loxtidine, AH-23,844)
