= Acid reducer =

Acid reducer may refer to:

- Antacid, a substance which neutralizes stomach acid
- H2 blocker, a medication that reduces and blocks the production of stomach acid
- Proton-pump inhibitor, a medication that reduces and blocks the production of stomach acid
