= Bismuth subcitrate/metronidazole/tetracycline =

Combination drug

Combination of
- Bismuth subcitrate: Bismuth salt
- Metronidazole: Nitroimidazole antimicrobial
- Tetracycline: Tetracycline class antimicrobial

Clinical data
- Trade names: Pylera
- AHFS/Drugs.com: Professional Drug Facts
- License data: US DailyMed: Bismuth subcitrate potassium, metronidazole, tetracycline hydrochloride
- ATC code: A02BD08 (WHO)

Legal status
- Legal status: US: ℞-only

Identifiers
- CAS Number: 1227500-19-7
- ChemSpider: none
- KEGG: D10245

The drug combination bismuth subcitrate/metronidazole/tetracycline (trade name Pylera) is used for the treatment of peptic ulcer with an infection by the bacterium Helicobacter pylori. It is taken by mouth.

It is available as a generic medication.

== Medical uses ==
This combination is used together with omeprazole as a 'quadruple therapy' for the eradication of H. pylori and for preventing peptic ulcers that are caused by this bacterium.

== Contraindications ==
The drug must not be taken by pregnant women, because tetracycline is known to cause tooth and bone defects in unborn children. It is also contraindicated in breastfeeding women, children up to 12 years of age, and by patients with impaired liver or renal (kidney) function, because no studies in such persons have been conducted. Tetracycline is also likely to be harmful in liver patients.

== Adverse effects ==
Common side effects include diarrhea, nausea and dysgeusia (distortion of the sense of taste), especially a metallic taste. These effects are known from the drug's components as well as from other antibiotics. A very rare but dangerous reaction is Stevens–Johnson syndrome, a life-threatening condition affecting the skin, which has also been described under metronidazole and tetracycline as separate drugs.

== Interactions ==
Metronidazole in combination with alcohol causes severe reactions such as vomiting and flushes in many patients. Tetracycline resorption is reduced by dairy products, antacids and other products containing calcium, magnesium, aluminium as well as iron.

== Chemical properties ==
Bismuth subcitrate potassium is a salt of bismuth (Bi^{3+}), potassium (K^{+}) and citrate (C_{6}H_{5}O_{7}^{3−}), containing about 25.6% (mass percent) bismuth, which is the active moiety, and 22.9% potassium. Tetracycline is contained as the hydrochloride, and metronidazole as the pure substance.
