= Facid =

Facid can refer to:

- Facid, a trade name for Famotidine
- Faculdade Integral Diferencial, a university in Teresina
