= Sucralfate =

Chemical compound and gastrointestinal medication

Clinical data
- Trade names: Carafate
- AHFS/Drugs.com: Monograph
- MedlinePlus: a681049
- License data: US DailyMed: Sucralfate
- Routes of administration: By mouth, rectal
- ATC code: A02BX02 (WHO)

Legal status
- Legal status: US: ℞-only; In general: ℞ (Prescription only)

Pharmacokinetic data
- Bioavailability: 3-5% (local acting)
- Metabolism: GI; liver: unknown
- Elimination half-life: unknown
- Excretion: Feces, urine

Identifiers
- IUPAC name: Hexadeca-μ-hydroxytetracosahydroxy[μ_{8}-[1,3,4,6-tetra-O-sulfo-β-Dfructofuranosyl-α-D-glucopyranoside tetrakis(hydrogen sulfato)8-)]]hexadecaaluminum
- CAS Number: 54182-58-0
- PubChem CID: 6398525
- DrugBank: DB00364
- ChemSpider: 4911161
- UNII: XX73205DH5
- KEGG: C07314
- ChEMBL: ChEMBL611727
- CompTox Dashboard (EPA): DTXSID1048966
- ECHA InfoCard: 100.053.636

Chemical and physical data
- Formula: C_{12}H_{54}Al_{16}O_{75}S_{8}
- Molar mass: 2086.67 g·mol^{−1}

Sucralfate, sold under various brand names, is a medication used to treat stomach ulcers, gastroesophageal reflux disease (GERD), radiation proctitis, and stomach inflammation and to prevent stress ulcers. Its usefulness in people infected by H. pylori is limited. It is used by mouth (for ulcers of the upper gastrointestinal tract) and rectally (for radiation proctitis).

Common side effects include constipation. Serious side effects may include bezoar formation and encephalopathy. Use appears to be safe in pregnancy and breastfeeding. How it works is unclear but is believed to involve binding to the ulcer and protecting it from further damage.

Sucralfate was approved for medical use in the United States in 1981. It is available as a generic medication. In 2023, it was the 240th most commonly prescribed medication in the United States, with more than 1 million prescriptions.

== Medical uses ==
Sucralfate is used for the treatment of active duodenal ulcers not related to the use of nonsteroidal anti-inflammatory drugs (NSAIDs), as the mechanism behind these ulcers is due to acid oversecretion. In the United States, sucralfate is not approved by the Food and Drug Administration for gastric ulcers, but is widely used because of evidence of efficacy. The use for sucralfate in peptic ulcer disease has diminished recently, but it is still the preferred agent for stress ulcer prevention.

Sucralfate has also been used for the following conditions:

- Active duodenal ulcer not related to NSAID use
- Maintenance therapy for resolved duodenal ulcers
- Gastric ulcer not related to NSAID use and gastritis due to GERD—Triple combination therapy with lansoprazole + cisapride + sucralfate can significantly improve symptoms and quality of life and was more cost-effective than ranitidine combination group.
- Aphthous ulcer and stomatitis due to radiation or chemotherapy—The 2013 guidelines of the International Society of Oral Oncology does not recommended sucralfate for the prevention of oral mucositis in head and neck cancer patients receiving radiotherapy or chemoradiation due to a lack of efficacy found in a randomized controlled trial.
- Gastro-esophageal reflux disease during pregnancy—First-line drug therapy combined with lifestyle and diet modification.
- Stress ulcer prophylaxis—The use of sucralfate rather than H_{2} antagonists for stress ulcer prophylaxis, and measures to prevent aspiration, such as continuous subglottic suctioning, have been shown to reduce the risk of ventilator-associated pneumonia (VAP). Sucralfate is less effective for prophylaxis against gastrointestinal bleeding than either a PPI or H2-blocker. For that reason, it is not commonly used for stress ulcer prophylaxis.
- Prevention of stricture formation—Sucralfate has an inhibitory effect on stricture formation in experimental corrosive burns and can be used in the treatment of corrosive esophageal burns to enhance mucosal healing and suppress stricture formation
- Proctitis from ulcerative colitis
- Rectal bleeding due to proctitis from radiation to treat cancers of the cervix, prostate, and colon.
  - Grade 1 bleeding experienced immediate relief with sucrasulfate enema for 1 month.
  - Grade 2 bleeding, sucrasulfate enema] and/or coagulation were effective.
  - Grade 3 bleeding lasted for 1 year despite frequent transfusions and coagulation.
  - Grade 2 and 3 rectal bleeding occurred in 8.5% of people. The most significant risk factor was the ICRU-CRBED. Prompt treatment with a combination of sucrasulfate enema and coagulation is effective in controlling Grade 1 and 2 rectal bleeding without the development of fistula or stricture.
- Treatment of anastomotic ulcer after gastric bypass surgery
- Sucralfate suspension is recommended by the US-based National Capital Poison Center (Poison Control) as an intervention for known or suspected button battery ingestions to reduce the risk and severity of injury to the esophagus prior to the battery's endoscopic removal.
- Protection against ventilator-associated pneumonia - Reductions in gastric acidity and volumes increase bacterial overgrowth and the incidence of ventilator-associated pneumonia. Sucralfate may be considered to have the advantage over H2-blockers and PPIs in this regard because sucralfate does not change the pH of gastric fluid. A majority of meta-analyses found that sucralfate therapy decreased the incidence of ventilator-associated pneumonia compared to H2-antagonists.

== Side effects ==
The most common side effect seen is constipation (2–3%). Less commonly reported side effects (<0.5%) include flatulence, headache, hypophosphatemia, xerostomia (dry mouth), and bezoar formation. Use of this drug is not recommended for people with chronic kidney failure, as it might cause aluminium accumulation and toxicity. A few well-controlled studies have been carried out investigating the safety and efficacy of sucralfate in children and pregnant women (Pregnancy Category B).

== Mechanism of action ==
Sucralfate is a locally acting substance that in an acidic environment (pH < 4) reacts with hydrochloric acid in the stomach to form a cross-linking, viscous, paste-like material capable of acting as an acid buffer for as long as 6 to 8 hours after a single dose. It also attaches to proteins on the surface of ulcers, such as albumin and fibrinogen, to form stable insoluble complexes. These complexes serve as protective barriers at the ulcer surface, preventing further damage from acid, pepsin, and bile. In addition, sucralfate prevents back diffusion of hydrogen ions, and absorbs both pepsin and bile acids.

It has been thought that sucralfate also stimulates the production of prostaglandin E_{2}, epidermal growth factors (EGF), bFGF, and gastric mucus.

== Pharmacokinetics ==
- Onset: 1–2 hr (initial onset for peptic ulcer disease (PUD))
- Absorption: <5% Orally
- Duration: Up to 6 hours due to high affinity for defective mucosa (PUD)
- Bioavailability: 5%, sucralfate is considered non-systemic, sucrose octasulfate: 5%, aluminum: 0.005%
- Metabolism: Not metabolized, excreted unchanged in urine
- Excretion: Primarily in feces as unchanged drug

== Society and culture ==
=== Brand names ===
Brand names include: Carafate in the US, Sucramal in Italy, Sucrafil Pioneer brand in India exported in more than 18 countries, Sufrate, Sucralpro, Sucral, Sutra, Sulcrate in Canada, Discral (sucralfato) in México, Ulsanic in South Africa and Israel, Andapsin in Sweden, Antepsin in Turkey, and Ulsidex in Indonesia.
