= Ranoxyl =

Ranoxyl may refer to:

- Amoxicillin or Ranoxyl, a moderate-spectrum antibiotic
- Ranitidine or Ranoxyl, a stomach acid production inhibitor
