= Triple therapy =

Triple therapy may refer to:

- a therapy for Helicobacter pylori eradication
- any of the three drug treatments used in Management of HIV/AIDS
- the combination of methotrexate, sulfasalazine, and hydroxychloroquine used to treat rheumatoid arthritis
- the combination of docetaxel, neoadjuvant hormonal therapy (NHT), and androgen deprivation therapy (ADT) used to treat high volume metastatic hormone sensitive prostate cancer (mHSPC).
