= Sufotidine =

Chemical compound

Clinical data
- Routes of administration: Oral
- ATC code: None

Legal status
- Legal status: Development terminated

Identifiers
- IUPAC name: 2-methyl-5-(methylsulfonylmethyl)-N-[3-[3-(piperidin-1-ylmethyl)phenoxy]propyl]-1,2,4-triazol-3-amine
- CAS Number: 80343-63-1
- PubChem CID: 71763
- ChemSpider: 64802
- UNII: 56B0591Y76
- KEGG: D05939
- CompTox Dashboard (EPA): DTXSID50230254

Chemical and physical data
- Formula: C_{20}H_{31}N_{5}O_{3}S
- Molar mass: 421.56 g·mol^{−1}
- 3D model (JSmol): Interactive image
- SMILES: CN1C(=NC(=N1)CS(=O)(=O)C)NCCCOC2=CC=CC(=C2)CN3CCCCC3
- InChI: InChI=1S/C20H31N5O3S/c1-24-20(22-19(23-24)16-29(2,26)27)21-10-7-13-28-18-9-6-8-17(14-18)15-25-11-4-3-5-12-25/h6,8-9,14H,3-5,7,10-13,15-16H2,1-2H3,(H,21,22,23); Key:JEYKZWRXDALMNG-UHFFFAOYSA-N

Sufotidine (INN, USAN, codenamed AH25352) is a long-acting competitive H_{2} receptor antagonist which was under development as an antiulcerant by Glaxo (now GlaxoSmithKline). It was planned to be a follow-up compound to ranitidine (Zantac). When taken in doses of 600 mg twice daily it induced virtually 24-hour gastric anacidity thus closely resembling the antisecretory effect of the proton pump inhibitor omeprazole. Its development was terminated in 1989 from phase III clinical trials based on the appearance of carcinoid tumors in long-term toxicity testing in rodents.

== Synthesis ==
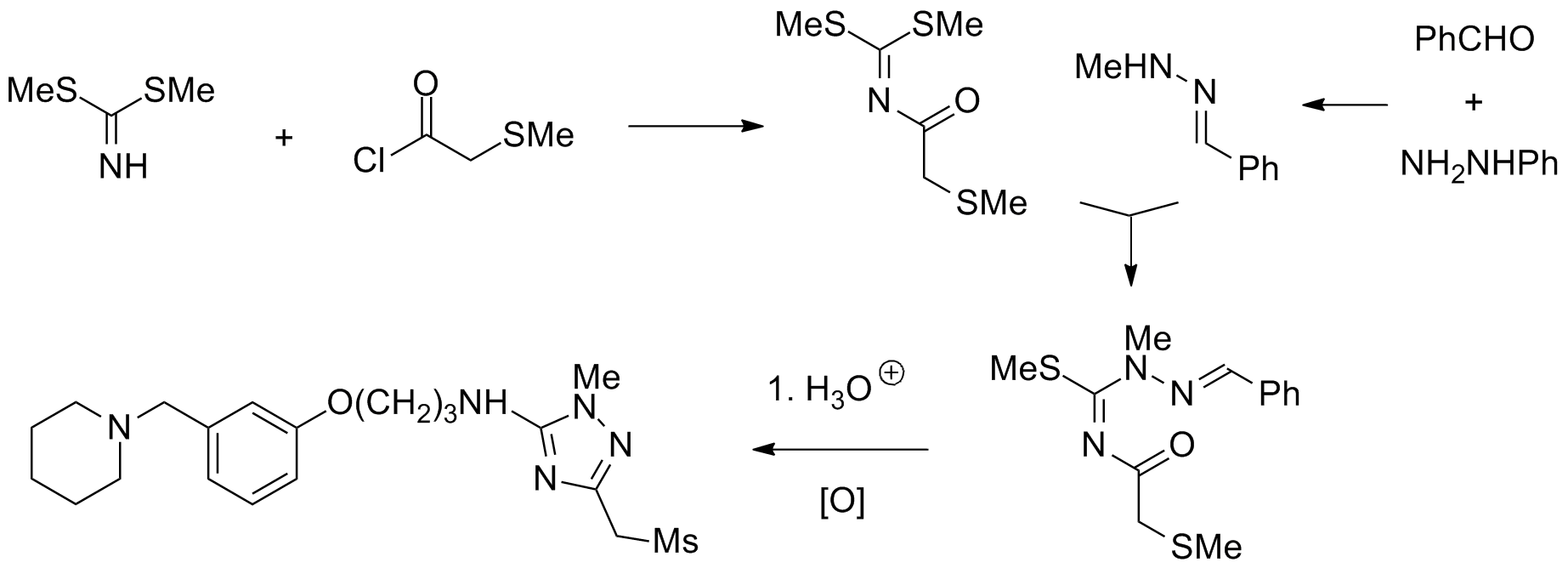

== See also ==
- Lavoltidine (previously known as loxtidine) — a similar compound in which methylsulfone group is replaced with hydroxyl
