= Nizatidine =

Chemical compound

Clinical data
- Trade names: Axid, Tazac
- AHFS/Drugs.com: Monograph
- MedlinePlus: a694030
- License data: US DailyMed: Nizatidine
- Pregnancy category: AU: B3
- Routes of administration: By mouth
- ATC code: A02BA04 (WHO)

Legal status
- Legal status: AU: S4 (Prescription only); CA: ℞-only / OTC; UK: POM (Prescription only); US: OTC / Rx-only

Pharmacokinetic data
- Bioavailability: >70%
- Protein binding: 35%
- Metabolism: Liver
- Elimination half-life: 1–2 hours
- Excretion: Kidney

Identifiers
- IUPAC name: (E)-1-N'-[2-[[2-[(dimethylamino)methyl]-1,3-thiazol-4-yl]methylsulfanyl]ethyl]-1-N-methyl-2-nitroethene-1,1-diamine
- CAS Number: 76963-41-2
- PubChem CID: 3033637
- IUPHAR/BPS: 7248
- DrugBank: DB00585
- ChemSpider: 2298266
- UNII: P41PML4GHR
- KEGG: D00440
- ChEBI: CHEBI:7601
- ChEMBL: ChEMBL653
- CompTox Dashboard (EPA): DTXSID5023376
- ECHA InfoCard: 100.155.683

Chemical and physical data
- Formula: C_{12}H_{21}N_{5}O_{2}S_{2}
- Molar mass: 331.45 g·mol^{−1}
- 3D model (JSmol): Interactive image
- SMILES: [O-][N+](=O)\C=C(/NC)NCCSCc1nc(sc1)CN(C)C
- InChI: InChI=1S/C12H21N5O2S2/c1-13-11(6-17(18)19)14-4-5-20-8-10-9-21-12(15-10)7-16(2)3/h6,9,13-14H,4-5,7-8H2,1-3H3/b11-6+; Key:SGXXNSQHWDMGGP-IZZDOVSWSA-N

Nizatidine is a histamine H_{2} receptor antagonist that inhibits stomach acid production, and is commonly used in the treatment of peptic ulcer disease and gastroesophageal reflux disease.

It was patented in 1980 and approved for medical use in 1988. It was developed by Eli Lilly.

== Medical use ==
Nizatidine is used to treat duodenal ulcers, gastric ulcers, and gastroesophageal reflux disease (GERD/GORD), and to prevent stress ulcers.

== Adverse effects ==
Side effects are uncommon, usually minor, and include diarrhea, constipation, fatigue, drowsiness, headache, and muscle aches.

== History and development ==
Nizatidine was developed by Eli Lilly, and was first marketed in 1988. It is considered to be equipotent with ranitidine and differs by the substitution of a thiazole ring in place of the furan ring in ranitidine. In September 2000, Eli Lilly announced they would sell the sales and marketing rights for Axid to Reliant Pharmaceuticals. Subsequently, Reliant developed the oral solution of Axid, marketing this in 2004, after gaining approval from the U.S. Food and Drug Administration (FDA). However, a year later, they sold rights of the Axid Oral Solution (including the issued patent protecting the product) to Braintree Laboratories.

== Society and culture ==
=== Brand names ===
Brand names include Tazac and Axid.
