= Valisure =

Independent American laboratory

- Type: Private
- Founded: 2015
- Founders: David Light; Adam Clark-Joseph
- Headquarters: New Haven, Connecticut
- Key people: David Light Chip Phillips (CEO)
- Website: valisure.com

Valisure is an American independent laboratory focused on testing the purity and safety of pharmaceutical drugs and consumer products. Valisure was founded in 2015 in New Haven.

== History ==
Valisure was founded in 2015 by Adam Clark-Joseph and David Light. After taking an anticonvulsant medication and experiencing negative side effects due to the poor quality of the drug, Clark-Joseph contacted Light about establishing a business testing pharmaceutical products. Valisure was originally established as a pharmacy, which, unlike typical pharmacies, tested drugs before distributing them. Valisure divested of the pharmacy business in 2021, opting instead to focus on testing.

In 2019, Valisure reported that it had tested Zantac and generic equivalents and discovered that they contained N-Nitrosodimethylamine, which is thought to be a carcinogen. In September of that year, Valisure submitted a Citizen Petition to the U.S. Food and Drug Administration seeking withdrawal of ranitidine products after its laboratory testing reported extraordinarily high levels of the carcinogenic nitrosamine NDMA; however, in subsequent litigation, the federal court's review of the scientific evidence found substantial problems with the methodology underlying Valisure's results, including evidence that the elevated-temperature testing procedure could itself generate NDMA from ranitidine, and ultimately excluded the plaintiffs' expert testimony on general causation as scientifically unreliable.

In 2021, Johnson & Johnson recalled sun tan lotions after Valisure discovered they contained high levels of benzene.

In February 2024, Valisure announced Chip Phillips as their new CEO, succeeding David Light. They also announced funding from AlleyCorp and Connecticut Innovations.

Clients of Valisure include Kaiser Permanente and the United States Armed Forces.
