= Reliant Pharmaceuticals =

Pharmaceutical company

- Industry: Pharmaceuticals
- Defunct: December 2007
- Fate: Acquired by GlaxoSmithKline
- Key people: Joseph J. Krivulka (co-founder)

Reliant Pharmaceuticals was a company purchased by GlaxoSmithKline in December 2007 for $1.65B. Co-founded by Joseph J. Krivulka.

It was known for six major products, including Lovaza (Omega-3), Axid (H2 blocker), Dynacirc CR (calcium channel blocker), Antara (fenofibrate), InnoPran XL (beta blocker), Lescol XL (Fluvastatin), and Rythmol SR (Class IC anti-arrhythmic).

Reliant Pharmaceuticals, Inc. was a pharmaceutical company that specialized in the development, commercialization and marketing of prescription therapeutic products. Reliant marketed six cardiovascular products in the United States and focused on promoting its products to targeted primary care and specialty physicians, as well as selected hospitals and academic centers in the United States. Reliants' sales force consisted of approximately 650 sales and marketing professionals nationwide.

In 2007, Reliant Pharmaceuticals was acquired by GSK for $1.65 billion in cash, after Reliant recorded net sales of $341 million in the nine months leading to September 30, 2007. The Lovaza drug accounted for 60% of the sales of the company for that period.
