= Lavoltidine =

Chemical compound

Clinical data
- Routes of administration: Oral
- ATC code: none

Legal status
- Legal status: Development terminated

Identifiers
- IUPAC name: [1-methyl-5-[3-[3-(piperidin-1-ylmethyl)phenoxy]propylamino]-1,2,4-triazol-3-yl]methanol
- CAS Number: 76956-02-0
- PubChem CID: 55473
- ChemSpider: 50093
- UNII: X16K5179V5
- CompTox Dashboard (EPA): DTXSID0020785

Chemical and physical data
- Formula: C_{19}H_{29}N_{5}O_{2}
- Molar mass: 359.474 g·mol^{−1}
- 3D model (JSmol): Interactive image
- SMILES: OCc1nn(C)c(n1)NCCCOc2cccc(c2)CN3CCCCC3

Lavoltidine (INN, USAN, BAN; previously known as loxtidine; development code AH-23,844) is a highly potent and selective H_{2} receptor antagonist which was under development by Glaxo Wellcome (now GlaxoSmithKline) as a treatment for gastroesophageal reflux disease but was discontinued due to the discovery that it produced gastric carcinoid tumors in rodents.

== See also ==
- H_{2} receptor antagonist
- Sufotidine (analogous sequence in which a sulfonyl group replaces the hydroxyl group)
