= Oxmetidine =

Chemical compound

Clinical data
- Other names: SKF 92994, SKF 92994-A2 (oxmetidine 2HCl)

Identifiers
- IUPAC name: 5-(1,3-benzodioxol-5-ylmethyl)-2-[2-[(5-methyl-1H-imidazol-4-yl)methylsulfanyl]ethylamino]-1H-pyrimidin-6-one
- CAS Number: 72830-39-8
- PubChem CID: 51710
- ChemSpider: 46799
- UNII: Z504D030RF
- CompTox Dashboard (EPA): DTXSID30223149
- ECHA InfoCard: 100.069.911

Chemical and physical data
- Formula: C_{19}H_{21}N_{5}O_{3}S
- Molar mass: 399.47 g·mol^{−1}
- 3D model (JSmol): Interactive image
- SMILES: O=C/1NC(=N\C=C\1Cc2ccc3OCOc3c2)/NCCSCc4nc[nH]c4C

Oxmetidine (development code SKF 92994) is an H_{2} histamine receptor receptor antagonist.
