= Lafutidine =

Chemical compound

Clinical data
- AHFS/Drugs.com: International Drug Names
- Routes of administration: Oral
- ATC code: A02BA08 (WHO)

Identifiers
- IUPAC name: 2-(furan-2-ylmethylsulfinyl)-N-[(Z)-4-[4-(piperidin-1-ylmethyl)pyridin-2-yl]oxybut-2-enyl]acetamide
- CAS Number: 206449-93-6
- PubChem CID: 5282136
- ChemSpider: 4445337
- UNII: 49S4O7ADLC
- KEGG: D01131
- CompTox Dashboard (EPA): DTXSID0046434
- ECHA InfoCard: 100.118.935

Chemical and physical data
- Formula: C_{22}H_{29}N_{3}O_{4}S
- Molar mass: 431.55 g·mol^{−1}
- 3D model (JSmol): Interactive image
- SMILES: C1CCCCN1Cc2ccnc(c2)OC/C=C\CNC(=O)CS(=O)Cc3ccco3
- InChI: InChI=1S/C22H29N3O4S/c26-21(18-30(27)17-20-7-6-14-28-20)23-9-2-5-13-29-22-15-19(8-10-24-22)16-25-11-3-1-4-12-25/h2,5-8,10,14-15H,1,3-4,9,11-13,16-18H2,(H,23,26)/b5-2-; Key:KMZQAVXSMUKBPD-DJWKRKHSSA-N

Lafutidine (INN) is a second generation histamine H_{2} receptor antagonist having multimodal mechanism of action and used to treat gastrointestinal disorders. It is marketed in South Korea, Japan and India.

== Medical use ==
Lafutidine is used to treat gastric ulcers, duodenal ulcers, as well as wounds in the lining of the stomach associated with acute gastritis and acute exacerbation of chronic gastritis.

== Adverse effects ==
Adverse events observed during clinical trials included constipation, diarrhea, drug rash, nausea, vomiting and dizziness.

== Mechanism of action ==
Like other H_{2} receptor antagonists, lafutidine acts by preventing the secretion of gastric acid. It also activates calcitonin gene-related peptide, resulting in the stimulation of nitric oxide (NO) and regulation of gastric mucosal blood flow, increases somatostatin levels also resulting in less gastric acid secretion, causes the stomach lining to generate more mucin, inhibits neutrophil activation thus preventing injury from inflammation, and blocks the attachment of Helicobacter pylori to gastric cells.

== Trade names ==
It is marketed in Japan as Stogar by UCB and in India as Lafaxid by Zuventus Healthcare. It is also marketed in South Korea as Ildong Lafutidine by Ildong Pharmaceutical Co Ltd.
