= Lansoprazole =

Stomach acid suppressing medication

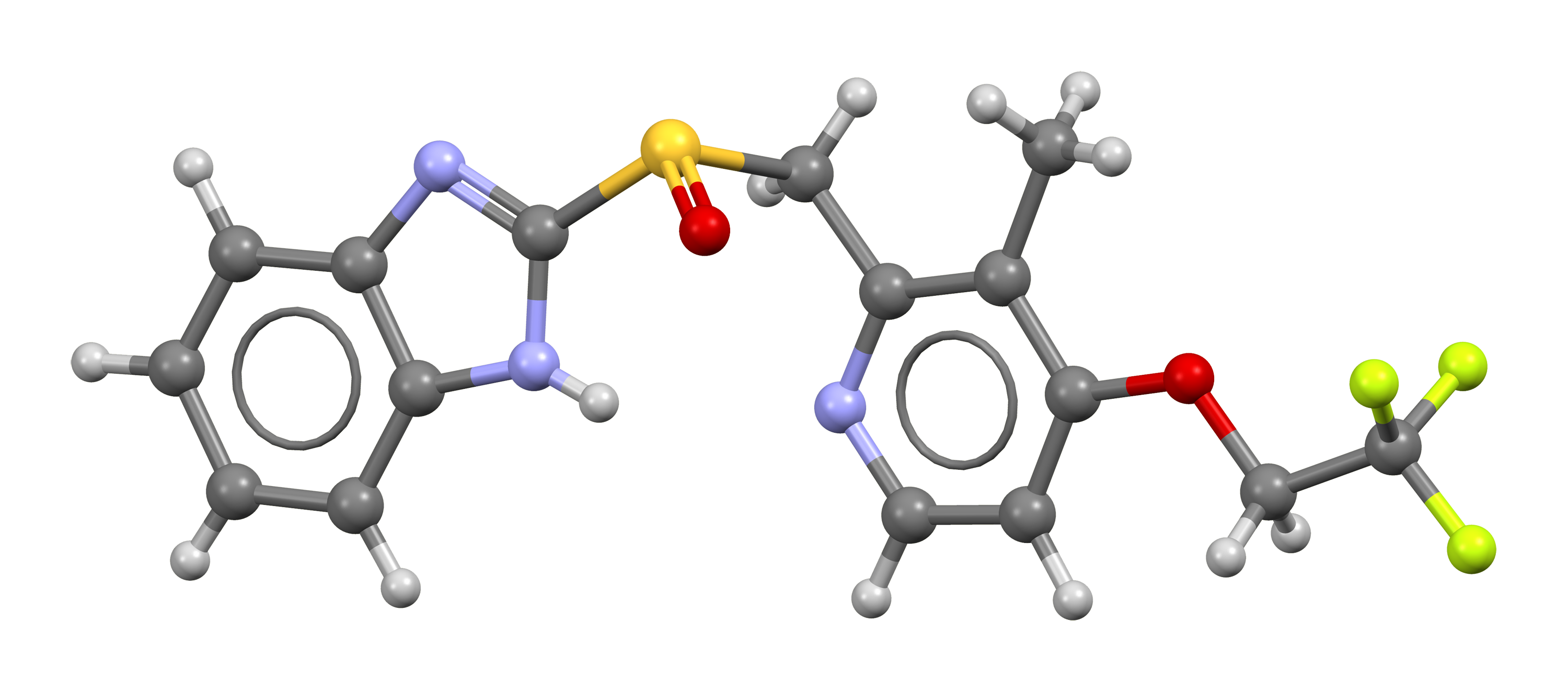

Clinical data
- Pronunciation: /lænˈsoʊprəzoʊl/ lan-SOH-prə-zohl
- Trade names: Prevacid, others
- Other names: AG 1749
- AHFS/Drugs.com: Monograph
- MedlinePlus: a695020
- License data: US DailyMed: Lansoprazole
- Pregnancy category: AU: B3
- Routes of administration: By mouth, intravenous
- Drug class: Proton pump inhibitor
- ATC code: A02BC03 (WHO)

Legal status
- Legal status: AU: S2, S3, & S4; UK: POM (Prescription only); US: OTC / Rx-only

Pharmacokinetic data
- Bioavailability: 80% or more
- Protein binding: 97%
- Metabolism: Liver (CYP3A4- and CYP2C19-mediated)
- Elimination half-life: 1.0–1.5 hours
- Excretion: Kidney and fecal

Identifiers
- IUPAC name: 2-{[3-methyl-4-(2,2,2-trifluoroethoxy)pyridin-2-yl]methanesulfinyl}-1H-benzimidazole
- CAS Number: 103577-45-3
- PubChem CID: 3883
- IUPHAR/BPS: 7208
- DrugBank: DB00448
- ChemSpider: 3746
- UNII: 0K5C5T2QPG
- KEGG: D00355
- ChEBI: CHEBI:6375
- ChEMBL: ChEMBL480
- CompTox Dashboard (EPA): DTXSID4023200
- ECHA InfoCard: 100.173.220

Chemical and physical data
- Formula: C_{16}H_{14}F_{3}N_{3}O_{2}S
- Molar mass: 369.36 g·mol^{−1}
- 3D model (JSmol): Interactive image
- Chirality: Racemic mixture
- Melting point: 178 °C (352 °F) (decomposes)
- SMILES: FC(F)(F)COc1ccnc(c1C)CS(=O)c2[nH]c3ccccc3n2
- InChI: InChI=1S/C16H14F3N3O2S/c1-10-13(20-7-6-14(10)24-9-16(17,18)19)8-25(23)15-21-11-4-2-3-5-12(11)22-15/h2-7H,8-9H2,1H3,(H,21,22); Key:MJIHNNLFOKEZEW-UHFFFAOYSA-N

Lansoprazole, sold under the brand name Prevacid (among others), is a medication which is used to treat too much stomach acid by reducing stomach acid. It is a proton pump inhibitor (PPI), used to treat peptic ulcer disease, gastroesophageal reflux disease, and Zollinger–Ellison syndrome. Its effectiveness is similar to that of other gastric acid pump inhibitors. It is available as a prescription medication as well as an over-the-counter medication in the United States in capsule or tablet form, and is administered orally. Onset of symptom relief usually begins within one to two hours, while gastric acid inhibitory effects generally last at least 24 hours. Lansoprazole is generally considered a medication meant to be taken over longer periods of time. Many people use lansoprazole as a daily medication; some other medical indications have a treatment length of two to four weeks.

Common side effects include constipation, abdominal pain, and nausea. Serious side effects may include osteoporosis, low blood magnesium, Clostridioides difficile infection, and pneumonia. Use in pregnancy and breastfeeding is of unclear safety. It works by blocking H^{+}/K^{+}-ATPase in the parietal cells of the stomach.

Lansoprazole was developed and patented as Prevacid by Takeda Pharmaceuticals in 1984; it became commercially available for medical use in 1992. Its patent was set to expire in 2009. Lansoprazole is available as a generic medication. In May 2009, a 24-hour dose version of Prevacid was approved for over-the-counter sale by the U.S. Food and Drug Administration (FDA); it has been available as an over-the-counter medication in the United States since November 2009.

As of 2024, lansoprazole was the 208th most commonly prescribed medication in the United States. This does not include over-the-counter purchases.

== Medical uses ==
Lansoprazole is used for treatment of:

- Ulcers of the stomach and duodenum, and NSAID-induced ulcers
- Helicobacter pylori infection, alongside antibiotics (adjunctive treatment), treatment to kill H. pylori causing ulcers or other problems involves using two other drugs besides lansoprazole known as "triple therapy", and involves taking twice daily for 10 or 14 days lansoprazole, amoxicillin, and clarithromycin
- Gastroesophageal reflux disease
- Zollinger–Ellison syndrome

There is no good evidence that it works better than other PPIs.

== Side effects ==
Side effects of PPIs in general and lansoprazole in particular may include:

- Common: diarrhea, abdominal pain
- Infrequent: dry mouth, insomnia, drowsiness, blurred vision, rash, pruritus
- Rarely and very rarely: taste disturbance, liver dysfunction, peripheral oedema, hypersensitivity reactions (including bronchospasm, urinary, angioedema, anaphylaxis), photosensitivity, fever, sweating, depression, interstitial nephritis, blood disorders (including leukopenia, leukocytosis, pancytopenia, thrombocytopenia), arthralgia, myalgia, skin reactions including (erythroderma, Stevens–Johnson syndrome, toxic epidermal necrolysis, bullous eruption)

PPIs may be associated with a greater risk of hip fractures and Clostridioides difficile-associated diarrhea.

== Interactions ==
Lansoprazole interacts with several other drugs, either due to its nature or as a PPI.

- PPIs reduce absorption of antifungals (itraconazole and ketoconazole) and possibly increase digoxin in plasma
- Increases plasma concentrations of cilostazol (risk of toxicity)

Lansoprazole possibly interacts with, among other drugs:

- sucralfate
- ampicillin
- bisacodyl
- clopidogrel
- delavirdine
- fluvoxamine
- iron salts
- voriconazole
- aminophylline and theophylline
- astemizole

== Chemistry ==
It is a racemic 1:1 mixture of the enantiomers dexlansoprazole and levolansoprazole. Dexlansoprazole is an enantiomerically pure active ingredient of a commercial drug as a result of the enantiomeric shift. Lansoprazole's plasma elimination half-life (1.5 h) is not proportional to the duration of the drug's effects to the person (i.e., gastric acid suppression).

== History ==
Lansoprazole was originally synthesized at Takeda and was given the development name AG 1749. Takeda patented it in 1984 and the drug was launched in 1991. In the United States, it was approved for medical use in 1995.

== Society and culture ==
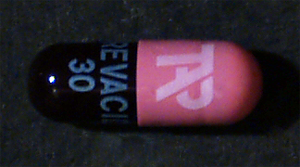
Prevacid 30 mg

=== Patents ===
Patent protection of the lansoprazole molecule expired on 10 November 2009, and generic formulations became available under many brand names in many countries. Some formulations may not be available in generic form.

=== Availability ===
Since 2009, lansoprazole has been available over the counter (OTC) in the U.S. as Prevacid 24HR and as Lansoprazole 24HR. In Australia, it is marketed by Pfizer as Zoton.

== Research ==
In vitro experiments have shown that lansoprazole binds to the pathogenic form of tau protein. As of 2015 laboratory studies were underway on analogs of lansoprazole to explore their use as potential PET imaging agents for diagnosing tauopathies including Alzheimer's disease.
