= Helicobacter pylori eradication protocols =

Treatment protocols

Helicobacter pylori eradication protocols is a standard name for all treatment protocols for peptic ulcers and gastritis in the presence of Helicobacter pylori infection. The primary goal of the treatment is not only temporary relief of symptoms but also total elimination of H. pylori infection. Patients with active duodenal or gastric ulcers and those with a prior ulcer history should be tested for H. pylori. Appropriate therapy should be given for eradication. Patients with MALT lymphoma should also be tested and treated for H. pylori since eradication of this infection can induce remission in many patients when the tumor is limited to the stomach. Several consensus conferences, including the Maastricht Consensus Report, recommend testing and treating several other groups of patients but there is limited evidence of benefit. This includes patients diagnosed with gastric adenocarcinoma (especially those with early-stage disease), patients found to have atrophic gastritis or intestinal metaplasia, as well as first-degree relatives of patients with gastric adenocarcinoma since the relatives themselves are at increased risk of gastric cancer partly due to the intrafamilial transmission of H. pylori. To date, it remains controversial whether to test and treat all patients with functional dyspepsia, gastroesophageal reflux disease, or other non-GI disorders as well as asymptomatic individuals.

== Antibiotic resistance ==
The success of H. pylori cure depends on the type and duration of therapy, patient compliance and bacterial factors such as antibiotic resistance. Patients most often fail to respond to initial H. pylori eradication therapy because of noncompliance or antibiotic resistance. Patients should be queried about any side effects, missed doses, and completion of therapy. As culture with antibiotic sensitivities is not routinely performed when a H. pylori infection is diagnosed, it is generally recommended that different antibiotics be given at higher doses for 14 days.

== Regimens for Helicobacter pylori therapy ==
Achieving optimal eradication of H. pylori has proven difficult. Combination regimens that use two or three antibiotics with a proton pump inhibitor and/or bismuth are required to achieve adequate rates of eradication and to reduce the number of failures due to antibiotic resistance. In the United States, up to 50% of strains are resistant to metronidazole and 13% are resistant to clarithromycin. At present, experts disagree on the optimal regimen.

=== First-line therapy: triple therapy ===
In areas of low clarithromycin resistance, including the United States, a 14-day course of "triple therapy" with an oral proton pump inhibitor (typically pantoprazole 40 mg), clarithromycin 500 mg, and amoxicillin 1 g (or, if penicillin allergic, metronidazole 500 mg), all given twice daily for 14 days, is recommended for first-line therapy. This regimen can achieve rates of eradication in up to 70% of cases.

=== Second-line therapy: quadruple therapy ===
A 14-day course of "quadruple therapy" with a proton pump inhibitor, bismuth, tetracycline, and metronidazole or tinidazole is a more complicated but also more effective regimen. In a 2011 randomized, controlled trial, the per protocol eradication rates were 93% with quadruple therapy and 70% with triple therapy. Bismuth-based quadruple therapy is recommended as first line therapy for patients in areas with high clarithromycin resistance (> 20%), in patients who have previously been treated with a macrolide antibiotic, or as second-line therapy for patients whose infection persists after an initial course of triple therapy. Several studies reported eradication rates of > 90% using a 10-day sequential regimen consisting of four drugs: a proton pump inhibitor and amoxicillin for 5 days, followed by a proton pump inhibitor, clarithromycin, and tinidazole for 5 days. However, subsequent studies confirmed equivalent or superior efficacy when all four drugs were given concomitantly for 10 days (non-bismuth quadruple therapy).

In quadruple therapy, bismuth (Bi^{3+}) is usually supplied in the form of bismuth subcitrate. Bismuth subsalicylate and ranitidine bismuth citrate (combines ranitidine, an older medicine that reduces stomach acid production) also see use.

=== Sequential therapy ===
Sequential therapy is a newer approach that combines a 5-day course of a "dual therapy" using a proton pump inhibitor in combination with amoxicillin, with a sequential second 5-day course of the standard "triple therapy". High-dose dual therapy has comparable efficacy with bismuth-containing quadruple therapy, with fewer adverse effects and higher compliance. Although initial studies promisingly reported higher eradication rates, there is no superiority compared to the other therapies except in the presence of clarithromycin resistant organisms. In regions of high clarithromycin resistance, there is a high rate of eradication with a 14-day quadruple therapy consisting of a proton pump inhibitor, amoxicillin, clarithromycin, and nitroimidazole; still, the latter not available in the United States.

=== Other proposed regimes ===
A number of other eradication regimens have been proposed. In the Table below they are compared to with standard regimes.

Comparison of Helicobacter pylori eradication regimens
Regimen	Duration, days	Drugs used	Notes
Vonoprazan-amoxicillin dual therapy	7-14	vonoprazan 20 mg bid and amoxicillin 750 mg bid	As successful as bismuth-containing quadruple therapy
Triple therapy	7–14	PPI (standard dose) bid, amoxicillin 1 g bid and clarithromycin 0.5 g bid	First line therapy in areas with low clarithromycin resistance
Sequential therapy	10	1st 5 days: PPI (standard dose) bid and amoxicillin 1 g bid 2nd 5 days: metronidazole 0.5 g bid and clarithromycin 0.5 g bid	First line therapy
Concomitant therapy	7–10	PPI (standard dose bid), amoxicillin 1 g bid, metronidazole 0.5 g bid and clarithromycin 0.5 g bid	First line therapy
Hybrid therapy	14	1st week: PPI (standard dose) and amoxicillin 1 g bid 2nd week: PPI (standard dose), amoxicillin 1 g, metronidazole 0.5 g and clarithromycin 0.5 g bid	First line therapy
Bismuth-containing quadruple therapy	10–14	PPI (standard dose) bid, tetracycline 0.5 g qid, metronidazole 0.25 g qid and bismuth standard dose qid	First line or second line therapy
Levofloxacin-based triple therapy	10	PPI (standard dose) bid, levofloxacin 0.5 g qd and amoxicillin 1 g bid	Second line therapy if there is no fluoroquinolone resistance
Culture-guided therapy	10	PPI (standard dose) bid, bismuth standard dose qid and two antibiotics selected by sensitivity tests	Third line therapy if there is no fluoroquinolone resistance
Levofloxacin-based quadruple therapy	10	PPI (standard dose) bid, bismuth standard dose qid, levofloxacin 0.5 g qd and amoxicillin 1 g bid	Third line therapy
High-dose dual PPI therapy	14	PPI (high dose) qid and amoxicillin 0.5 g qid	Third line therapy
Rifabutin triple therapy	14	PPI (standard dose) bid, rifabutin 0.15 g bid and amoxicillin 1 g bid	Third line therapy
Furazolidone-based quadruple therapy	10-14	PPI (standard dose) bid, bismuth standard dose qid, tetracycline 0.5 g bid and furazolidone 200 mg bid	First line for penicillin-allergic patients
Note: qd – once daily, bid – twice daily, qid – four times a day

== Adjuvant therapies ==
Recent meta-analyses have proposed two adjuvant therapies which may help in the eradication of H. pylori. Periodontal therapy or what is known as scaling and root planing and probiotics both need further studies to confirm their adjuvant role.

=== Role of periodontal therapy ===
A 2016 systematic review has found that periodontal therapy (the use of mouthwash, tooth brushing, and manual removal of dental plaques) may have a role as an added treatment for short- and long-term follow up. For these results to be confirmed with regards eradication and non-recurrence, larger studies need to be carried out.

=== Role of probiotics ===
Some studies have recently evaluated the role of the yeast Saccharomyces boulardii as a coadjutant in the eradication of H. pylori and in the prevention of the secondary effects of antibiotic therapy such as antibiotic-associated diarrhea. A meta-analysis showed that supplementation with S. boulardii significantly increased the H. pylori eradication rate and reduced the risk of overall H. pylori therapy-related adverse effects. In a cohort of patients in Korea who received S. boulardii for 4 weeks during and after a 1-week course of standard triple therapy, eradication rates were 10% higher than for those who did not receive the supplement.

Other studies in which Bifidobacterium spp. and Lactobacillus acidophilus have been administered revealed no significant difference in eradication rates in patients who were infected with strains susceptible to both antibiotics and who were treated with standard triple therapy. Further studies will be necessary to clarify the exact role of the probiotics in the eradication treatment.

== History ==
One of the first "eradication protocols", if not the first, was used by J. Robin Warren and Barry Marshall. Barry Marshall treated his own gastritis, which developed following intentional ingestion of H. pylori culture. He used bismuth salt and metronidazole. This treatment effectively cured his gastritis and eliminated the H. pylori infection. This is not the current eradication protocol.

One of the first "modern" eradication protocols was a one-week triple therapy, which the Sydney gastroenterologist Thomas Borody formulated in 1987. As of 2006, a standard triple therapy is amoxicillin, clarithromycin, and a proton pump inhibitor such as omeprazole, lansoprazole, pantoprazole, or esomeprazole. Protocols with metronidazole were also in use. An example of a fixed-dose combination is PantoPac, containing pantoprazole, clarithromycin, and amoxicillin.

== Research ==
Giving acetylcysteine before antibiotic treatment was effective in overcoming H. pylori antibiotic resistance in a study with 40 patients who had at least four eradication failures in their history. The researchers believe it works by inhibiting the formation of biofilm.

Whereas the conventional proton pump inhibitor-based triple therapy is effective, there is research in using longer acid suppression therapies, in particular, using potassium competitive acid blocker (P-CAB) triple and dual therapy. In particular, vonoprazan is approved by the US Food and Drug Administration (FDA) for H. pylori eradication.
