= Stress ulcer =

Tissue defect caused by physiological stress

- Specialty: Intensive care medicine, gastroenterology, digestive system surgery (upper gastrointestinal surgery)

A stress ulcer is defined as ulceration in the upper GI tract as a result of hospitalization which can become complicated by upper gastrointestinal bleeding. These ulcers can be caused by shock, sepsis, trauma or other conditions and are found in patients with chronic illnesses. These ulcers are a significant issue in patients in critical and intensive care.

A distinction between peptic and stress ulcers is their location in the upper gastrointestinal tract. Whereas ordinary peptic ulcers are found commonly in the gastric antrum and the duodenum, stress ulcers are usually found in the fundic mucosa and can be located anywhere within the stomach and proximal duodenum. Stress ulcers tend to present with multiple lesions whereas in peptic ulcers this is much more uncommon.

== Signs and symptoms ==
Stress ulcers, as defined by overt bleeding and hemodynamic instability, decreased hemoglobin, and/or need for transfusion, were seen in 1.5% of patients in the 2252 patients in the Canadian Critical Care Trials group study. People with stress ulcers have a longer ICU length of stay (up to eight days) and a higher mortality (up to four-fold) than patients who do not have stress ulceration and bleeding. While the bleeding and transfusions associated with the stress ulcerations contribute to the increased mortality, the contribution of factors like low blood pressure, sepsis, and respiratory failure to the mortality independently of the stress ulceration cannot be ignored.

== Risk factors ==
Risk factors for stress ulcer formation that have been identified are numerous and varied. However, two landmark studies and one position paper exist that addresses the topic of risk factors for stress ulcer formation:

- Non-critically ill medical patients with two or more of the following: respiratory failure, sepsis, heart failure, hepatic encephalopathy, jaundice, kidney failure, stroke, hypertension, previous gastrointestinal disease and treatment with corticosteroids, NSAIDS, heparin, or warfarin.
- In surgical critically ill patients, only those patients who are on a mechanical ventilator for more than 48 hours and/or those with a coagulopathy.
- The American Society of Health-System Pharmacists guideline recommends against the practice of stress ulcer prophylaxis in non-critically ill patients.

== Mechanisms ==
=== Location ===
The ulcerations may be superficial and confined to the mucosa, in which case they are more appropriately called erosions, or they may penetrate deeper into the submucosa. The former may cause diffuse mucosal oozing of blood, whereas the latter may erode into a submucosal vessel and produce frank hemorrhage.

=== Lesions ===
The characteristic lesions may be multiple, superficial mucosal erosions similar to erosive gastroduodenitis. Occasionally, there may be a large acute ulcer in the duodenum (Curling's ulcer).

Generally, there are multiple lesions located mainly in the stomach and occasionally in the duodenum. They range in depth from mere shedding of the superficial epithelium (erosion) to deeper lesions that involve the entire mucosal thickness (ulceration).

=== Formation ===
The pathogenic mechanisms are similar to those of erosive gastritis.

The pathogenesis of stress ulcer is unclear but probably is related to a reduction in mucosal blood flow or a breakdown in other normal mucosal defense mechanisms in conjunction with the injurious effects of acid and pepsin on the gastroduodenal mucosa.

== Diagnosis ==
Stress ulcer is suspected when there is upper gastrointestinal bleeding in the appropriate clinical setting, for example, when there is upper gastrointestinal bleeding in elderly patients in a surgical intensive care unit (ICU) with heart and lung disease, or when there is upper gastrointestinal bleeding in patients in a medical ICU who require respirators.

Stress ulcer can be diagnosed after the initial management of gastrointestinal bleeding, the diagnosis can be confirmed by upper GI endoscopy.

== Prevention ==
The need for medications to prevent stress ulcer among those in the intensive care unit is unclear. As of 2014, the quality of the evidence is poor. It is unclear which agent is best or if prevention is needed at all. Benefit may only occur in those who are not being fed. Possible agents include antacids, H2-receptor blockers, sucralfate, and proton pump inhibitors (PPIs). Tentative evidence supports that PPIs may be better than H2 blockers.

Concerns with the use of stress ulcer prophylaxis agents include increased rates of pneumonia and Clostridioides difficile colitis.

== Treatment ==
The principles of management are the same as for the chronic ulcer. The steps of management are similar as in erosive gastritis.

Endoscopic means of treating stress ulceration may be ineffective and operation required. It is believed that shunting blood away from the mucosa makes the mucous membrane ischaemic and more susceptible to injury.

Treatment of stress ulceration usually begins with prevention. Careful attention to respiratory status, acid-base balance, and treatment of other illnesses help prevent the conditions under which stress ulcers occur. Patients who develop stress ulcers typically do not secrete large quantities of gastric acid; however, acid does appear to be involved in the pathogenesis of the lesions. Thus it is reasonable either to neutralize acid or to inhibit its secretion in patients at high risk.

In case of severe hemorrhagic or erosive gastritis and stress ulcers, a combination of antacids and H2-blockers may stop active bleeding and prevent bleeding from happening again. In selected patients, either endoscopic therapy or selective infusion of vasopressin into the left gastric artery may help control the hemorrhage.

== Epidemiology ==
Among those in the intensive care unit, ulceration resulting in bleeding is very rare.
