= H2 receptor antagonist =

Class of medications

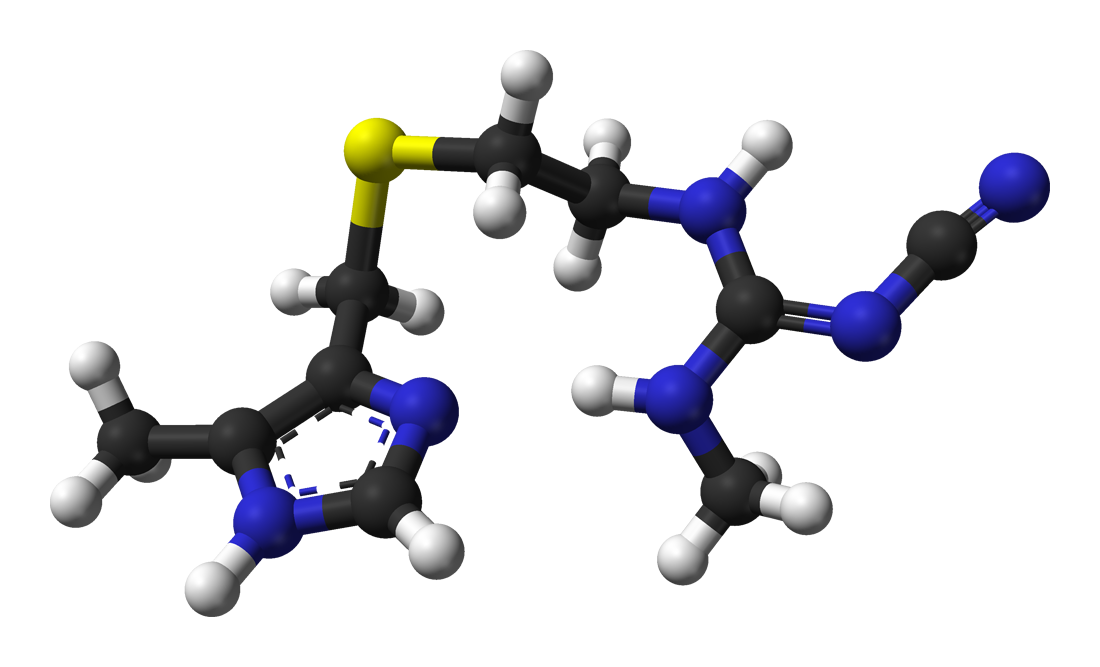
Ball-and-stick model of cimetidine, the prototypical H_{2} receptor antagonist

H_{2} antagonists, sometimes referred to as H2RAs and also called H_{2} blockers, are a class of medications that block the action of histamine at the histamine H_{2} receptors of the parietal cells in the stomach. This decreases the production of stomach acid. H_{2} antagonists can be used in the treatment of dyspepsia, peptic ulcers and gastroesophageal reflux disease. They have been surpassed by proton pump inhibitors (PPIs). The PPI omeprazole was found to be more effective at both healing and alleviating symptoms of ulcers and reflux oesophagitis than the H_{2} blockers ranitidine and cimetidine.

H_{2} antagonists, which all end in "-tidine", are a type of antihistamine. In general usage, however, the term "antihistamine" typically refers to H_{1} antagonists, which relieve allergic reactions. Like the H_{1} antagonists, H_{2} antagonists function as inverse agonists rather than receptor antagonists (with the exception of burimamide), due to the constitutive activity of these receptors.

The prototypical H_{2} antagonist, called cimetidine, was developed by Sir James Black at Smith, Kline & French – now GlaxoSmithKline – in the mid-to-late 1960s. It was first marketed in 1976 and sold under the trade name Tagamet, which became the first blockbuster drug. The use of quantitative structure-activity relationships (QSAR) led to the development of other agents – starting with ranitidine, first sold as Zantac, which was thought to have a better adverse effect profile (later disproven), fewer drug interactions and be more potent.

== Class members ==
- cimetidine (Tagamet)
- ranitidine (Zantac) (withdrawn in the US, suspended in EU and Australia for carcinogenic contaminants)
- famotidine (Pepcid)
- nizatidine (Tazac, Axid)
- roxatidine
- lafutidine (Stogar, Lafaxid, Ildong Lafutidine)
- lavoltidine (discontinued as carcinogen)
- niperotidine (withdrawn as causing liver damage)
- sufotidine

== History and development ==
Cimetidine was the prototypical histamine H_{2} receptor antagonist from which later drugs were developed. Cimetidine was the culmination of a project at Smith, Kline & French (SK&F; now GlaxoSmithKline) by James W. Black, C. Robin Ganellin, and others to develop a histamine receptor antagonist that would suppress stomach acid secretion.

In 1964, it was known that histamine stimulated the secretion of stomach acid, and also that traditional antihistamines had no effect on acid production. From these facts the SK&F scientists postulated the existence of two different types of histamine receptors. They designated the one acted upon by the traditional antihistamines as H_{1}, and the one acted upon by histamine to stimulate the secretion of stomach acid as H_{2}.

The SK&F team used a classical design process starting from the structure of histamine. Hundreds of modified compounds were synthesised in an effort to develop a model of the then-unknown H_{2} receptor. The first breakthrough was N^{α}-guanylhistamine, a partial H_{2}receptor antagonist. From this lead, the receptor model was further refined, which eventually led to the development of burimamide, a specific competitive antagonist at the H_{2} receptor. Burimamide is 100 times more potent than N^{α}-guanylhistamine, proving its efficacy on the H_{2} receptor.

The potency of burimamide was still too low for oral administration. And efforts on further improvement of the structure, based on the structure modification in the stomach due to the acid dissociation constant of the compound, led to the development of metiamide. Metiamide was an effective agent; however, it was associated with unacceptable nephrotoxicity and agranulocytosis. It was proposed that the toxicity arose from the thiourea group, and similar guanidine analogues were investigated until the discovery of cimetidine, which would become the first clinically successful H_{2} antagonist.

Ranitidine (common brand name Zantac) was developed by Glaxo (also now GlaxoSmithKline), in an effort to match the success of Smith, Kline & French with cimetidine. Ranitidine was also the result of a rational drug design process utilising the by-then-fairly-refined model of the histamine H_{2} receptor and quantitative structure-activity relationships (QSAR). Glaxo refined the model further by replacing the imidazole-ring of cimetidine with a furan-ring with a nitrogen-containing substituent, and in doing so developed ranitidine, which was found to have a much better tolerability profile (i.e. fewer adverse drug reactions), longer-lasting action, and ten times the activity of cimetidine.

Ranitidine was introduced in 1981 and was the world's biggest-selling prescription drug by 1988. The H_{2} receptor antagonists have since largely been superseded by the even more effective proton pump inhibitors (PPIs), with omeprazole becoming the biggest-selling drug for many years.

== Pharmacology ==
The H_{2} antagonists are competitive antagonists of histamine at the parietal cell's H_{2} receptor. They suppress the normal secretion of acid by parietal cells and the meal-stimulated secretion of acid. They accomplish this by two mechanisms: Histamine released by enterochromaffin-like cells (ECL) in the stomach is blocked from binding on parietal cell H_{2} receptors, which stimulate acid secretion; therefore, other substances that promote acid secretion (such as gastrin and acetylcholine) have a reduced effect on parietal cells when the H_{2} receptors are blocked.

== Clinical uses ==
H_{2} antagonists are used by clinicians in the treatment of acid-related gastrointestinal conditions, including:

- Peptic ulcer disease (PUD)
- Gastroesophageal reflux disease (GERD/GORD)
- Dyspepsia
- Prevention of stress ulcer (a specific indication of ranitidine)
- Prevention of aspiration pneumonitis during surgery. Oral H_{2} antagonists reduce gastric acidity and volume and have shown to reduce the frequency of aspiration pneumonitis; however, this aspiration benefit has not been shown with IV H_{2} antagonists.

People who suffer from infrequent heartburn may take either antacids or H_{2} receptor antagonists for treatment. The H_{2} antagonists offer several advantages over antacids, including longer duration of action (6–10 hours vs 1–2 hours for antacids), greater efficacy, and ability to be used prophylactically before meals to reduce the chance of heartburn occurring. Proton pump inhibitors, however, are the preferred treatment for erosive esophagitis since they have been shown to promote healing better than H_{2}antagonists.

== Adverse effects ==
H_{2} antagonists are generally well tolerated, with the exception of cimetidine, which more commonly elicits the following adverse drug reactions (ADRs) than other H_{2} antagonists:

Infrequent ADRs include hypotension. Rare ADRs include headache, tiredness, dizziness, confusion, diarrhea, constipation, and rash. In addition, gynecomastia occurred in 0.1–0.5% of men treated for non-hypersecretory conditions with cimetidine for 1 month or longer and in about 2% of men treated for pathologic hypersecretory conditions; in even fewer men, cimetidine may also cause loss of libido, and impotence, all of which are reversible upon discontinuation.

A 31-study review found that the overall risk of pneumonia is about 1 in 4 higher among H_{2} antagonist users.

According to a 2022 umbrella review of meta-analyses, the use of H_{2} receptor antagonist is associated with pneumonia, peritonitis, necrotizing enterocolitis, Clostridioides difficile infection, liver cancer, gastric cancer, and hip fracture diseases.

Famotidine has been associated with agranulocytosis, the destruction of white blood cells.

== Research ==
=== Bladder diseases ===
Histamine can cause bladder inflammation and contribute to the symptoms of such bladder diseases as cystitis (inflammation of the bladder) or painful bladder disease. Histamine binds to H_{2} receptors in the bladder smooth muscle, leading to relaxation of the bladder muscle and promotion of urine storage. Histamine does not seem to have a direct role in the development of bladder diseases, but it can contribute to bladder inflammation and associated symptoms.

H_{2} receptors in the bladder play a role in regulating bladder contraction.

H_{2} receptor antagonists have been shown to reduce bladder contractions and improve bladder function in animal studies. Blocking the activation of H_{2} receptors in the bladder leads to decreased bladder contractions and improved urine storage. While H_{2} receptor antagonists may have a potential role in managing bladder conditions such as overactive bladder, they are not typically used in treating cystitis or painful bladder disease, and their mechanism of action in bladder diseases is still not fully understood. There is limited research that histamine H_{2} receptor antagonists can potentially alleviate symptoms of cystitis or painful bladder disease.

== Drug interactions ==
Skeletal formula of famotidine. Unlike cimetidine, famotidine has no significant interactions with other drugs.

With regard to pharmacokinetics, cimetidine in particular interferes with some of the body's mechanisms of drug metabolism and elimination through the liver cytochrome P450 (CYP) pathway. To be specific, cimetidine is an inhibitor of the P450 enzymes CYP1A2, CYP2C9, CYP2C19, CYP2D6, CYP2E1, CYP3A4. By reducing the metabolism of drugs through these enzymes, cimetidine may increase their serum concentrations to toxic levels. Many drugs are affected, including warfarin, theophylline, phenytoin, lidocaine, quinidine, propranolol, labetalol, metoprolol, methadone, tricyclic antidepressants, some benzodiazepines, dihydropyridine calcium channel blockers, sulfonylureas, metronidazole, and some recreational drugs such as ethanol and methylenedioxymethamphetamine (MDMA).

The more recently developed H_{2}receptor antagonists are less likely to alter CYP metabolism. Ranitidine is not as potent a CYP inhibitor as cimetidine, although it still shares several of the latter's interactions (such as with warfarin, theophylline, phenytoin, metoprolol, and midazolam). Famotidine has negligible effect on the CYP system, and appears to have no significant interactions.

== See also ==
- H_{1}-receptor antagonist
- H_{3}-receptor antagonist
