= Metiamide =

- Metiamide

Names
- Preferred IUPAC name N-Methyl-N'-(2-{[(5-methyl-1H-imidazol-4-yl)methyl]sulfanyl}ethyl)thiourea
- Other names 1-Methyl-3-(2-{[(5-methyl-1H-imidazol-4-yl)methyl]thio}ethyl)thiourea

Identifiers
CAS Number	34839-70-8
3D model (JSmol)	Interactive image
ChEMBL	ChEMBL275446
ChemSpider	1265996
DrugBank	DB08805
IUPHAR/BPS	1233
PubChem CID	1548992
UNII	3K7670861M
CompTox Dashboard (EPA)	DTXSID80188390
- InChI: InChI=1S/C9H16N4S2/c1-7-8(13-6-12-7)5-15-4-3-11-9(14)10-2/h6H,3-5H2,1-2H3,(H,12,13)(H2,10,11,14) Key: FPBPLBWLMYGIQR-UHFFFAOYSA-N
- SMILES: CNC(=S)NCCSCc1nc[nH]c1C

Properties
Chemical formula	C_{9}H_{16}N_{4}S_{2}
Molar mass	244.38 g·mol^{−1}
- Except where otherwise noted, data are given for materials in their standard state (at 25 °C [77 °F], 100 kPa). verify (what is ?) Infobox references

Metiamide is a histamine H_{2} receptor antagonist developed from another H_{2} antagonist, burimamide. It was an intermediate compound in the development of the successful anti-ulcer drug cimetidine (Tagamet).

== Development of metiamide from burimamide ==
After discovering that burimamide is largely inactive at physiological pH, due to the presence of its electron-donating side chain, the following steps were undertaken to stabilize burimamide:

- addition of a sulfide group close to the imidazole ring, giving thiaburimamide
- addition of methyl group to the 4-position on the imidazole ring to favor the tautomer of thiaburimamide which binds better to the H_{2} receptor

These changes increased the bioavailability metiamide so that it is ten times more potent than burimamide in inhibiting histamine-stimulated release of gastric acid. The clinical trials that began in 1973 demonstrated the ability of metiamide to provide symptomatic relief for ulcerous patients by increasing healing rate of peptic ulcers. However, during these trials, an unacceptable number of patients dosed with metiamide developed agranulocytosis (decreased white blood cell count).

== Modification of metiamide to cimetidine ==
It was determined that the thiourea group was the cause of the agranulocytosis. Therefore, replacement of the thiocarbonyl in the thiourea group was suggested:

- with urea or guanidine resulted in a compound with much less activity (only 5% of the potency of metiamide)
- however, the NH form (the guanidine analog of metiamide) did not show agonistic effects
- to prevent the guanidine group being protonated at physiological pH, electron-withdrawing groups were added
- adding a nitrile or nitro group prevented the guanidine group from being protonated and did not cause agranulocytosis

The nitro and cyano groups are sufficiently electronegative to reduce the pK_{a} of the neighboring nitrogens to the same acidity of the thiourea group, hence preserving the activity of the drug in a physiological environment.

== Synthesis ==
Reacting ethyl 2-chloroacetoacetate (1) with 2 molar equivalents of formamide (2) gives 4-carboethoxy-5-methylimidazole (3). Reduction of the carboxylic ester (3) with sodium in liquid ammonia via Birch reduction gives the corresponding alcohol (4). Reaction of that with cysteamine (mercaptoethylamine), as its hydrochloride, leads to intermediate 5. In the strongly acid medium, the amine is completely protonated; this allows the thiol to express its nucleophilicity without competition and the acid also activates the alcoholic function toward displacement. Finally, condensation of the amine with methyl isothiocyanate gives metiamide (6).

Metiamide synthesis:
