= Burimamide =

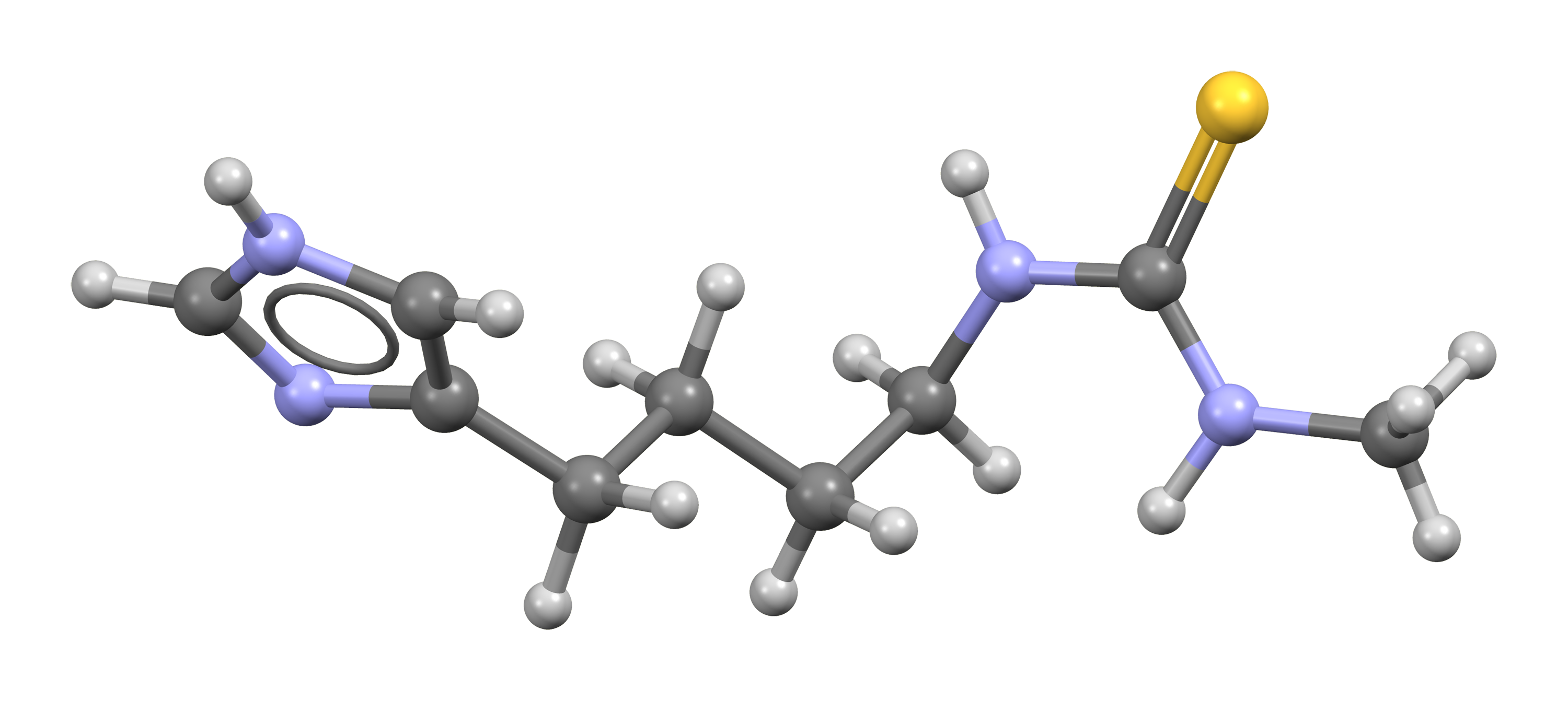

Names
- IUPAC name 1-[4-(1H-imidazol-5-yl)butyl]-3-methylthiourea

Identifiers
CAS Number	34970-69-9
3D model (JSmol)	Interactive image
ChEMBL	ChEMBL12160
ChemSpider	2297780
KEGG	C07448
PubChem CID	3032915
UNII	TN5A4OD2TV
CompTox Dashboard (EPA)	DTXSID00188519
- InChI: InChI=1S/C9H16N4S/c1-10-9(14)12-5-3-2-4-8-6-11-7-13-8/h6-7H,2-5H2,1H3,(H,11,13)(H2,10,12,14) Key: HXRBAVXGYZUSED-UHFFFAOYSA-N; InChI=1/C9H16N4S/c1-10-9(14)12-5-3-2-4-8-6-11-7-13-8/h6-7H,2-5H2,1H3,(H,11,13)(H2,10,12,14) Key: HXRBAVXGYZUSED-UHFFFAOYAJ
- SMILES: CNC(=S)NCCCCc1c[nH]cn1

Properties
Chemical formula	C_{9}H_{16}N_{4}S
Molar mass	212.32 g/mol
- Except where otherwise noted, data are given for materials in their standard state (at 25 °C [77 °F], 100 kPa). verify (what is ?) Infobox references

Burimamide is an antagonist at the H_{2} and H_{3} histamine receptors. At physiological pH, it is largely inactive as an H_{2} antagonist, but its H_{3} affinity is 100x higher. It is a thiourea derivative.

Burimamide was first developed by scientists at Smith, Kline & French (SK&F; now GlaxoSmithKline) in their intent to develop a histamine antagonist for the treatment of peptic ulcers. The discovery of burimamide ultimately led to the development of cimetidine (Tagamet).

== See also ==
- Metiamide
- Cimetidine
