= Famotidine =

Medication that reduces stomach acid

- Skeletal structure of famotidine

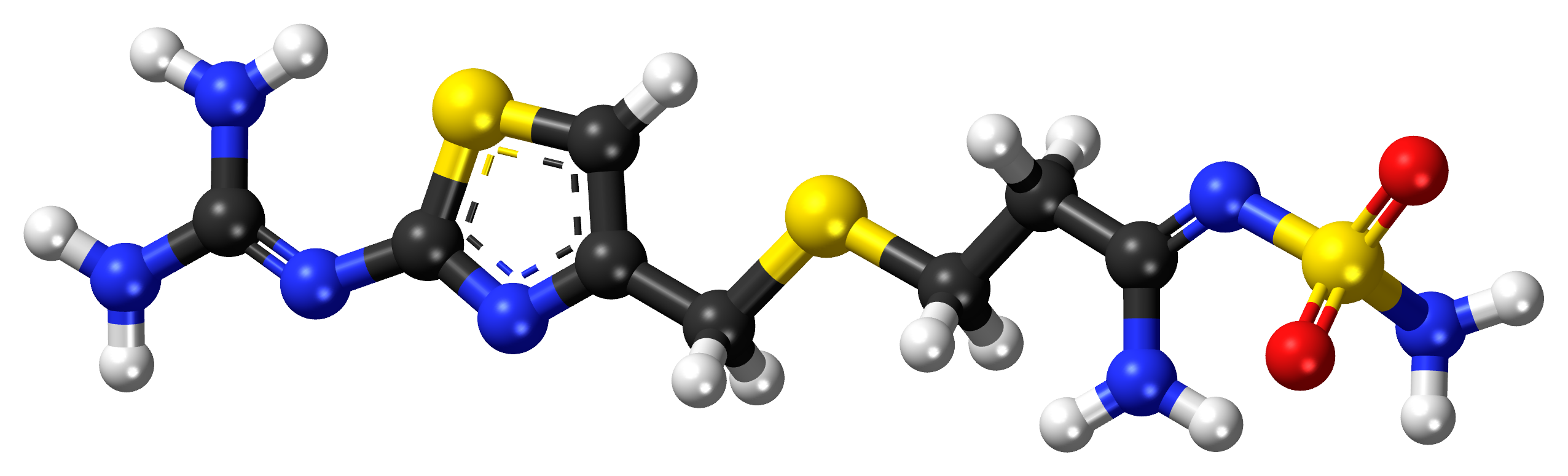
- Ball-and-stick model of famotidine

Clinical data
- Pronunciation: /fəˈmɒtɪdiːn/
- Trade names: Pepcid, Zantac 360, others
- AHFS/Drugs.com: Monograph
- MedlinePlus: a687011
- License data: US DailyMed: Famotidine
- Pregnancy category: AU: B1
- Routes of administration: Oral, intravenous
- Drug class: Histamine H_{2} receptor antagonist
- ATC code: A02BA03 (WHO)

Legal status
- Legal status: AU: S3 (Pharmacist only) / S4; UK: POM (Prescription only); US: OTC / Rx-only

Pharmacokinetic data
- Bioavailability: Oral: 40–45%
- Protein binding: 15–20%
- Metabolism: CYP1A2
- Metabolites: Famotidine S-oxide
- Onset of action: 90 minutes
- Elimination half-life: 2.5–3.5 hours
- Duration of action: 9 hours
- Excretion: Kidney (25–30% unchanged [Oral])

Identifiers
- IUPAC name: 3-[({2-[(diaminomethylidene)amino]-1,3-thiazol-4-yl}methyl)sulfanyl]-N-sulfamoylpropanimidamide
- CAS Number: 76824-35-6
- PubChem CID: 3325
- IUPHAR/BPS: 7074
- DrugBank: DB00927
- ChemSpider: 3208
- UNII: 5QZO15J2Z8
- KEGG: D00318
- ChEBI: CHEBI:4975
- ChEMBL: ChEMBL902
- PDB ligand: FO9 (PDBe, RCSB PDB)
- CompTox Dashboard (EPA): DTXSID5023039
- ECHA InfoCard: 100.116.793

Chemical and physical data
- Formula: C_{8}H_{15}N_{7}O_{2}S_{3}
- Molar mass: 337.44 g·mol^{−1}
- 3D model (JSmol): Interactive image
- SMILES: NS(=O)(=O)/N=C(\N)CCSCc1csc(n1)N=C(N)N
- InChI: InChI=1S/C8H15N7O2S3/c9-6(15-20(12,16)17)1-2-18-3-5-4-19-8(13-5)14-7(10)11/h4H,1-3H2,(H2,9,15)(H2,12,16,17)(H4,10,11,13,14); Key:XUFQPHANEAPEMJ-UHFFFAOYSA-N

Famotidine, sold under the brand name Pepcid among others, is a histamine H_{2} receptor antagonist medication that decreases stomach acid production. It is used to treat peptic ulcer disease, gastroesophageal reflux disease, and Zollinger–Ellison syndrome. It is taken by mouth or by injection into a vein. It begins working within an hour.

Common side effects include headache, abdominal pain, diarrhea or constipation, and dizziness. Serious side effects may include pneumonia and seizures. Use in pregnancy appears safe but has not been well studied, while use during breastfeeding is not recommended.

Famotidine was patented in 1979 and came into medical use in 1985. It is available as a generic medication. In 2023, it was the 33rd most commonly prescribed medication in the United States, with more than 16 million prescriptions.

== Medical uses ==
- Heartburn, acid indigestion, and sour stomach
- Treatment for gastric and duodenal ulcers
- Treatment for pathologic gastrointestinal hypersecretory conditions such as Zollinger–Ellison syndrome and multiple endocrine adenomas
- Treatment for gastroesophageal reflux disease (GERD)
- Treatment for esophagitis
- Part of a multidrug regimen for Helicobacter pylori eradication, although omeprazole may be somewhat more effective.
- Prevention of NSAID-induced peptic ulcers.
- Given to surgery patients before operations to reduce the risk of aspiration pneumonia.

== Pharmacokinetics ==
Famotidine has a delayed onset of action, beginning after 90 minutes. However, famotidine has a duration of effect of at least 540 minutes (9.0 h). At its peak effect, 210 minutes (3.5 h) after administration, famotidine reduces acid secretion by 7.3 mmol per 30 minutes.

== Side effects ==
The most common side effects associated with famotidine use include headache, dizziness, and constipation or diarrhea.

Famotidine may contribute to QT prolongation, particularly when used with other QT-elongating drugs, or in people with poor kidney function.

== Mechanism of action ==
Binding affinities
Target	Ki	Activity
H_{2}	~14 nM	Selective antagonist
H_{1}	>10 μM	Negligible
H_{3}	>10 μM	Negligible

Activation of H_{2} receptors located on parietal cells stimulates proton pumps to secrete acid into the stomach lumen. Famotidine, an H_{2} antagonist, blocks the action of histamine on the parietal cells, ultimately reducing acid secretion into the stomach.

== Interactions ==
Unlike cimetidine, the first H_{2} antagonist, famotidine has a minimal effect on the cytochrome P450 enzyme system and does not appear to interact with as many drugs as other medications in its class. Some exceptions include antiretrovirals such as atazanavir, chemotherapeutics such as doxorubicin, and antifungal medications such as itraconazole.

== History ==
Famotidine was developed by Yamanouchi Pharmaceutical Co. It was licensed in the mid-1980s by Merck & Co. and is marketed by a joint venture between Merck and Johnson & Johnson. The imidazole ring of cimetidine was replaced with a 2-guanidinothiazole ring. Famotidine proved to be nine times more potent than ranitidine, and thirty-two times more potent than cimetidine.

It was first marketed in 1981. Pepcid RPD orally disintegrating tablets were released in 1999. Generic preparations became available in 2001, e.g. Fluxid (Schwarz) or Quamatel (Gedeon Richter Ltd.).

In the United States and Canada, a product called Pepcid Complete, which combines famotidine with an antacid in a chewable tablet to relieve the symptoms of excess stomach acid quickly, is available. In the UK, this product was known as PepcidTwo until its discontinuation in April 2015.

Famotidine has poor bioavailibility (50%) due to its low solubility in the high pH of the intestines. Researchers are developing formulations that use gastroretentive drug delivery systems such as floating tablets to increase bioavailability by promoting local delivery (directly into the stomach wall) of these drugs to receptors in the parietal cell membrane.

== Society and culture ==
Certain preparations of famotidine are available over-the-counter (OTC) in various countries. In the United States and Canada, 10 mg and 20 mg tablets, sometimes in combination with an antacid, are available OTC. Larger doses still require a prescription. Famotidine is generally restricted to prescription only in the United Kingdom, although the medication is legally allowed to be sold OTC to persons aged over 16 in supplies lasting no more than a fortnight.

Formulations of famotidine in combination with ibuprofen were marketed by Horizon Pharma under the trade name Duexis.

== Research ==
=== COVID-19 ===
At the start of the COVID-19 pandemic, some doctors observed that anecdotally some hospitalized patients in China may have had better outcomes on famotidine than other patients who were not taking famotidine. This led to hypotheses about use of famotidine in treatment of COVID-19. Famotidine was considered a possible treatment for COVID-19 due to its potential anti-inflammatory effects. It was thought that famotidine could modify lung inflammation caused by coronaviruses. However, studies have shown that famotidine is not effective in reducing mortality or improving recovery in COVID-19 patients. Famotidine primarily works by blocking the effects of histamine and has some potential mechanisms of action that may contribute to its anti-inflammatory properties, including the inhibition of the production of certain pro-inflammatory cytokines such as TNF-alpha and IL-6. Another hypothesis was that famotidine might activate the vagus nerve inflammatory reflex to attenuate cytokine storm. Yet another hypothesis was that famotidine can reduce the activation of mast cells and the subsequent release of inflammatory mediators, therefore acting as a mast cell stabilizer. However, while famotidine may have some anti-inflammatory effects, there is currently insufficient evidence to support its use for treating inflammation associated with COVID-19. Therefore, it is not recommended for this purpose.

=== Other ===
Small-scale studies have shown inconsistent and inconclusive evidence of efficacy in treatment-resistant schizophrenia.

== Veterinary uses ==
Famotidine is given to dogs and cats with acid reflux.
