= Ranitidine =

Medication that decreases stomach acid

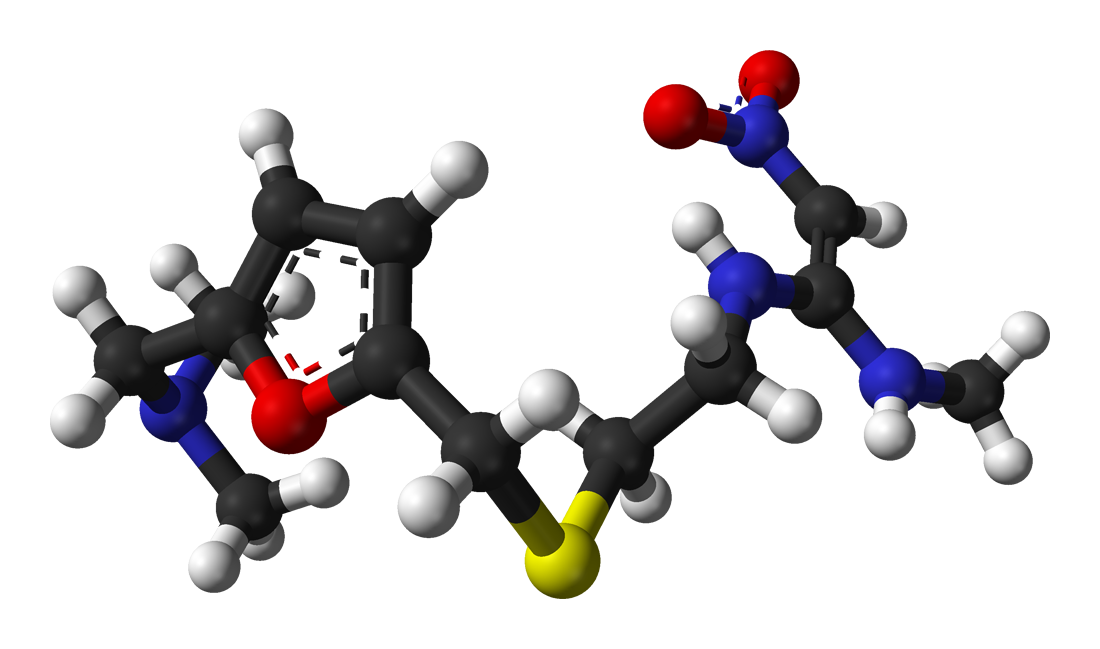

Clinical data
- Trade names: Zantac, others
- Other names: Dimethyl [(5-{[(2-{[1-(methylamino)-2-nitroethenyl]amino}ethyl)sulfanyl]methyl}furan-2-yl)methyl]amine, ranitidine hydrochloride (JAN JP)
- AHFS/Drugs.com: Monograph
- MedlinePlus: a601106
- License data: US DailyMed: Ranitidine
- Pregnancy category: AU: B1
- Routes of administration: By mouth, intravenous (IV)
- Drug class: Histamine H_{2} receptor antagonist
- ATC code: A02BA02 (WHO) A02BA07 (WHO) (ranitidine bismuth citrate)

Legal status
- Legal status: AU: S4 (Prescription only) / S2 (Pharmacy Medicine); CA: ℞-only / OTC; US: ℞-only / OTC; EU: Rx-only

Pharmacokinetic data
- Bioavailability: 50% (by mouth)
- Protein binding: 15%
- Metabolism: Liver: FMOs, including FMO3; other enzymes
- Onset of action: 55–65 minutes (150 mg dose); 55–115 minutes (75 mg dose)
- Elimination half-life: 2–3 hours
- Excretion: 30–70% kidney

Identifiers
- IUPAC name: N-(2-[(5-[(Dimethylamino)methyl]furan-2-yl)methylthio]ethyl)-N'-methyl-2-nitroethene-1,1-diamine
- CAS Number: 66357-35-5; HCl: 66357-59-3
- PubChem CID: 3001055; HCl: 3033332
- IUPHAR/BPS: 1234
- DrugBank: DB00863; HCl: DBSALT000487
- ChemSpider: 4863; HCl: 43590
- UNII: 884KT10YB7; HCl: BK76465IHM
- KEGG: D00422; HCl: D00673
- ChEBI: CHEBI:8776; HCl: CHEBI:8777
- ChEMBL: ChEMBL1790041; HCl: ChEMBL2110372
- CompTox Dashboard (EPA): DTXSID8045191
- ECHA InfoCard: 100.060.283

Chemical and physical data
- Formula: C_{13}H_{22}N_{4}O_{3}S
- Molar mass: 314.40 g·mol^{−1}
- 3D model (JSmol): Interactive image
- SMILES: CNC(=C[N+](=O)[O-])NCCSCC1=CC=C(O1)CN(C)C
- InChI: InChI=1S/C13H22N4O3S/c1-14-13(9-17(18)19)15-6-7-21-10-12-5-4-11(20-12)8-16(2)3/h4-5,9,14-15H,6-8,10H2,1-3H3; Key:VMXUWOKSQNHOCA-UHFFFAOYSA-N

Ranitidine, sold under the brand name Zantac among others, is a medication used to decrease stomach acid production. It is used in the treatment of peptic ulcer disease, gastroesophageal reflux disease, and Zollinger–Ellison syndrome. It can be given by mouth, injection into a muscle, or injection into a vein.

In September 2019, the probable carcinogen N-nitrosodimethylamine (NDMA) was discovered in ranitidine products from a number of manufacturers, resulting in recalls. In April 2020, ranitidine was withdrawn from the United States market and suspended in the European Union and Australia due to these concerns. A reformulated ranitidine was approved in Australia in October 2024, and in the United States in November 2025.

Common side effects include headaches, and pain or burning sensation if given by injection. Serious side effects may include cancer, liver problems, a slow heart rate, pneumonia, and the potential of masking stomach cancer. It is also linked to an increased risk of Clostridioides difficile colitis. Ranitidine is an H_{2} histamine receptor antagonist that works by blocking histamine, thus decreasing the amount of acid released by cells of the stomach.

Ranitidine was discovered in England in 1976 and came into commercial use in 1981. It is on the World Health Organization's List of Essential Medicines.

== Medical uses ==
- Relief of heartburn
- Short-term and maintenance therapy of gastric and duodenal ulcers
- With nonsteroidal anti-inflammatory drugs (NSAIDs) to reduce the risk of ulceration Proton-pump inhibitors (PPIs) are more effective for the prevention of NSAID-induced ulcers.
- Pathologic gastrointestinal (GI) hypersecretory conditions such as Zollinger–Ellison syndrome
- Gastroesophageal reflux disease (GORD or GERD)
- Erosive esophagitis
- Part of a multidrug regimen for Helicobacter pylori eradication to minimise the risk of duodenal ulcer recurrence
- Recurrent postoperative ulcer
- Upper GI bleeding
- For prevention of acid-aspiration pneumonitis during surgery, it can be administered preoperatively. The drug increases gastric pH, but generally has no effect on gastric volume. In a 2009 meta-analysis comparing the net benefit of PPIs and ranitidine to reduce the risk of aspiration before anaesthesia, ranitidine was found to be more effective than PPIs in reducing the volume of gastric secretions. Ranitidine may have an anti-emetic effect when administered preoperatively.
- Prevention of stress-induced ulcers in critically ill patients
- Used together with diphenhydramine as secondary treatment for anaphylaxis; after first-line epinephrine.

== Adverse effects ==
These adverse effects for ranitidine have been reported as events in clinical trials:

=== Central nervous system ===
Rare reports have been made of ranitidine causing malaise, dizziness, somnolence, insomnia, and vertigo. In severely ill, elderly patients, cases of reversible mental confusion, agitation, depression, and hallucinations have been reported.

=== Cardiovascular ===
Arrhythmias such as tachycardia, bradycardia, atrioventricular block, and premature ventricular beats have also been reported.

=== Gastrointestinal ===
Drugs in the H_{2} receptor blocker class of medicines have the potential to cause vitamin B_{12} deficiency, secondary to a reduction in food-bound vitamin B_{12} absorption. Elderly patients taking H_{2} receptor antagonists are more likely to require B_{12} supplementation than those not taking such drugs. H_{2} blockers may also reduce the absorption of drugs (azole antifungals, calcium carbonate) that require an acidic stomach. In addition, multiple studies suggest the use of H_{2} receptor antagonists such as ranitidine may increase the risk of infectious diarrhoea, including traveller's diarrhoea and salmonellosis. A 2005 study found that by suppressing acid-mediated breakdown of proteins, ranitidine may lead to an elevated risk of developing food or drug allergies, due to undigested proteins then passing into the GI tract, where sensitisation occurs. Patients who take these agents develop higher levels of immunoglobulin E against food, whether they had prior antibodies or not. Even months after discontinuation, an elevated level of IgE in 6% of patients was still found in the study.

=== Liver ===
Cholestatic hepatitis, liver failure, hepatitis, and jaundice have been noted, and require immediate discontinuation of the drug. Blood tests can reveal an increase in liver enzymes or eosinophilia, although in rare instances, severe cases of hepatotoxicity may require a liver biopsy.

=== Lungs ===
Ranitidine and other histamine H_{2} receptor antagonists may increase the risk of pneumonia in hospitalised patients. Ranitidine increases the risk of community-acquired pneumonia in adults and children.

=== Blood ===
Thrombocytopenia is a rare but known side effect. Drug-induced thrombocytopenia usually takes weeks or months to appear, but may appear within 12 hours of drug intake in a sensitised individual. Typically, the platelet count falls to 80% of normal, and thrombocytopenia may be associated with neutropenia and anemia.

=== Skin ===
Rash, including rare cases of erythema multiforme, and rare cases of hair loss and vasculitis have been seen.

== Precautions ==
=== Disease-related concerns ===
Relief of symptoms due to the use of ranitidine does not exclude the presence of a gastric malignancy. In addition, with kidney or liver impairment, ranitidine must be used with caution. It should be avoided in patients with porphyria, as it may precipitate an attack.

=== Children ===
In children, the use of gastric acid inhibitors has been associated with an increased risk for development of acute gastroenteritis and community-acquired pneumonia. A cohort analysis including over 11,000 neonates reported an association of H_{2} blocker use, and an increased incidence of necrotizing enterocolitis in very-low-birth-weight (VLBW) neonates. In addition, about a six-fold increase in mortality, necrotizing enterocolitis, and infection such as sepsis, pneumonia, urinary tract infection was reported in patients receiving ranitidine in a cohort analysis of 274 VLBW neonates.

=== Drug tests ===
Ranitidine may return a false positive result with some commercial urine drug screening kits for testing for drugs of abuse.

=== Cancer-causing due to inherent instability ===
In June 2019, Valisure informed the US Food and Drug Administration (FDA) that Zantac-branded and generic ranitidine resulted in very high levels of NDMA in the human body "due to an inherent instability of the ranitidine molecule".

In September 2019, the FDA acknowledged that ranitidine medicines, including some products sold under the brand name Zantac, contained a nitrosamine impurity called N-nitrosodimethylamine (NDMA), classified as a probable human carcinogen, at unacceptable levels. Health Canada announced that it was assessing NDMA in ranitidine and requested that manufacturers stop the distribution of ranitidine products in Canada until the NDMA levels in the products are found to be safe. Health Canada announced that ranitidine drugs were being recalled by Sandoz Canada, Apotex Inc., Pro Doc Limitée, Sanis Health Inc., and Sivem Pharmaceuticals ULC. The European Medicines Agency (EMA) started a European Union-wide review of ranitidine medicines at the request of the European Commission.

In October 2019, the US FDA observed that the third-party laboratory that found very high levels of NDMA was using higher temperatures in its tests to detect nitrosamine impurities. The NDMA was mostly generated by the added heat, but the higher temperatures are recommended for using a gas chromatography–mass spectrometry method to test for NDMA in valsartan and angiotensin II receptor blockers. The FDA stated that it recommends using a Liquid Chromatography-High Resolution Mass Spectrometry (LC-HRMS) testing protocol to test samples of ranitidine. Its LC-HRMS testing method does not use elevated temperatures, and has shown the presence of much lower levels of NDMA in ranitidine medicines than were reported by the third-party laboratory. International regulators using similar LC-MS testing methods have also shown the presence of lower but still unacceptable levels of NDMA in ranitidine samples. The FDA provided additional guidance about using another LC-MS method based on a triple-quadrupole MS platform.

In September 2019, Sandoz issued a "precautionary distribution stop" of all medicines containing ranitidine, followed a few days later by a recall of ranitidine hydrochloride capsules in the United States. The Italian Medicines Agency recalled all ranitidine that uses an active pharmaceutical ingredient from Saraca Laboratories. The Federal Union of German Associations of Pharmacists (Arzneimittelkommission der Deutschen Apotheker) published a list of recalled products, as did the Therapeutic Goods Administration in Australia.

In November 2019, the FDA stated that its tests found levels of NDMA in ranitidine and nizatidine that are similar to those that one may typically ingest with common foods such as grilled or smoked meats. The FDA also stated that its simulated gastric fluid model tests and simulated intestinal fluid model tests indicated that NDMA is not formed when exposed to acid in the stomach with a normal diet. The FDA advised companies to recall their ranitidine if testing shows levels of NDMA above the acceptable daily intake (96 nanograms per day or 0.32 parts per million for ranitidine). At the same time, it indicated that some levels of NDMA found in medicines still exceeded the agency's acceptable levels.

In December 2019, the FDA asked manufacturers of ranitidine and nizatidine products to expand their NDMA testing to include all lots of the medication before making them available to consumers.

By the end of 2019, ranitidine had already fallen from the 40th most commonly prescribed medication in the United States in 2018, to 53rd place for 2019, with about 13.6 million prescriptions for the year, versus nearly 19 million the previous year. This reflects total prescriptions for all of 2019, while safety concerns affected sales in only the final 4 months of the year.

In April 2020, FDA testing and evaluation prompted by information from third-party laboratories confirmed that NDMA levels increase in ranitidine even under normal storage conditions, and NDMA has been found to increase significantly in samples stored at higher temperatures, including those at which the product may be exposed during distribution and handling by consumers. The testing also showed that the level of NDMA increases as ranitidine medication ages. These conditions may raise the NDMA level above the acceptable daily intake limit. The EMA completed and issued their EU-wide review at the end of the month and the European Commission suspended all ranitidine products in the EU.

In August 2020, the EMA provided guidance to marketing authorization holders for avoiding the presence of nitrosamine impurities and asked them to review all chemical and biological human medicines for the presence of nitrosamines and to test the products at risk. In September 2020, the FDA issued guidance about the control of nitrosamine impurities in human drugs. An implementation plan was issued in February 2021.

In 2022, cancer concerns were found in a Taiwanese nationwide population study.

The FDA issued revised guidelines about nitrosamine impurities in September 2024.

==== List of recalls ====
In September 2019, Apotex recalled all over-the-counter ranitidine tablets sold in the United States at Walmart, Rite Aid, and Walgreens. These retailers, along with CVS, removed Zantac and some generics from their shelves.

In October 2019, the UK Medicines and Healthcare products Regulatory Agency issued a drug alert for ranitidine "... to proactively communicate the recall to hospitals, pharmacies, dispensing practices, retailers and wholesalers in the UK." This included all Zantac-branded preparations, along with all generic preparations of ranitidine from Teva UK Limited, Rosemont Pharmaceuticals Limited, Omega Pharma Limited and Galpharm International Limited, Perrigo Company plc, Creo Pharma Limited and Tillomed Laboratories Limited, OTC Concepts Ltd, Relonchem Ltd, Noumed Life Sciences Ltd, and Medreich Plc., Accord Healthcare, Medley Pharma Limited, and Medreich Plc.

In October 2019, the UK Department of Health and Social Care issued a supply distribution alert (SDA/2019/005) for all oral formulations of ranitidine.

In October 2019, Sanofi recalled all over-the-counter Zantac in the United States and Canada, Perrigo issued a worldwide recall of ranitidine, Dr. Reddy's issued a recall of all ranitidine products in the United States, and Novitium Pharma recalled all ranitidine hydrochloride capsules in the US.

In November 2019, Aurobindo Pharma, Amneal Pharmaceuticals, American Health Packaging, Golden State Medical Supply, and Precision Dose recalled some lots of ranitidine tablets, capsules, and syrup.

In December 2019, Glenmark Pharmaceutical recalled some lots of ranitidine tablets.

In January 2020, Appco Pharma and Northwind Pharmaceuticals recalled some lots of ranitidine tablets and capsules.

In February 2020, American Health Packaging recalled some lots of ranitidine tablets manufactured by Amneal Pharmaceuticals.

In April 2020, the FDA requested a manufacturer's market withdrawal of ranitidine, meaning that ranitidine products would not be available for prescription or over-the-counter sale in the US.

In April 2020, the Committee for Medicinal Products for Human Use of the European Medicines Agency recommended the suspension of all ranitidine medicines in the European Union because of the presence of unacceptable levels of NDMA.

A ranitidine manufacturer requested a re-examination of the decision, but in December 2020, the EMA confirmed its recommendation to suspend all ranitidine medicines in the European Union. The UK National Health Service (NHS) Web site as of December 2021 said "Ranitidine is not currently available in the UK or globally... It's not yet known whether it will be available again in future." A March 2024 review left the message up.

In 2021, Solara Active Pharma Sciences, which supplies ranitidine active pharmaceutical ingredient (API), said that it had mitigated the risks of the formation of NDMA during the manufacturing of ranitidine API. The company was granted a revised certificate by the European Directorate for the Quality of Medicines and Healthcare, which proves that the API complies with certain European rules. GlaxoSmithKline, Sanofi, and Teva said they had no plans to reintroduce the drug in the EU, but Accord Healthcare considered the possible reintroduction of ranitidine. However a control strategy regarding NDMA formation through the end of the product's shelf life, despite heat, time and digestion due to endogenous formation from the API, would be required.

== Pharmacology ==
=== Mechanism of action ===
Ranitidine is a competitive, reversible inhibitor of the action of histamine at the histamine H_{2} receptors found in gastric parietal cells. This results in decreased gastric acid secretion and gastric volume, and reduced hydrogen ion concentration. Ranitidine's acid-lowering effect is more pronounced for basal and nocturnal acid secretion than it is for food-stimulated acid secretion. Additional indirect effects of ranitidine are decreased pepsin secretion and increased nitrate-reducing bacterial flora.

In preclinical studies, ranitidine has also demonstrated immunomodulatory effects; in mouse models of breast cancer, ranitidine inhibited tumor growth through a B cell-dependent mechanism associated with enhanced antitumor antibody responses.

=== Pharmacokinetics ===
Oral absorption: 50%

Protein binding: 15%

Metabolism: The major metabolite in the urine is ranitidine N-oxide, which represents less than 4% of the dose. Other metabolites of ranitidine include ranitidine S-oxide (1%) and desmethyl ranitidine (1%).

Half-life elimination: With normal renal function, ranitidine taken orally has a half-life of 2.5–3.0 hours. If taken intravenously, the half-life is generally 2.0–2.5 hours in a patient with normal kidney function and normal creatinine clearance. In people with kidney dysfunction, the half-life may increase to 4 to 5 hours.

Excretion: The primary route of excretion is the urine. In addition, about 30% of the orally administered dose is collected in the urine as unabsorbed drug in 24 hours.

==== Elderly ====
In the elderly population, the plasma half-life of ranitidine is prolonged to 3–4 hours secondary to decreased kidney function causing decreased clearance.

==== Children ====
In general, studies of children aged 1 month to 16 years of age have shown no significant differences in pharmacokinetic parameter values in comparison to healthy adults, when correction is made for body weight.

== History ==
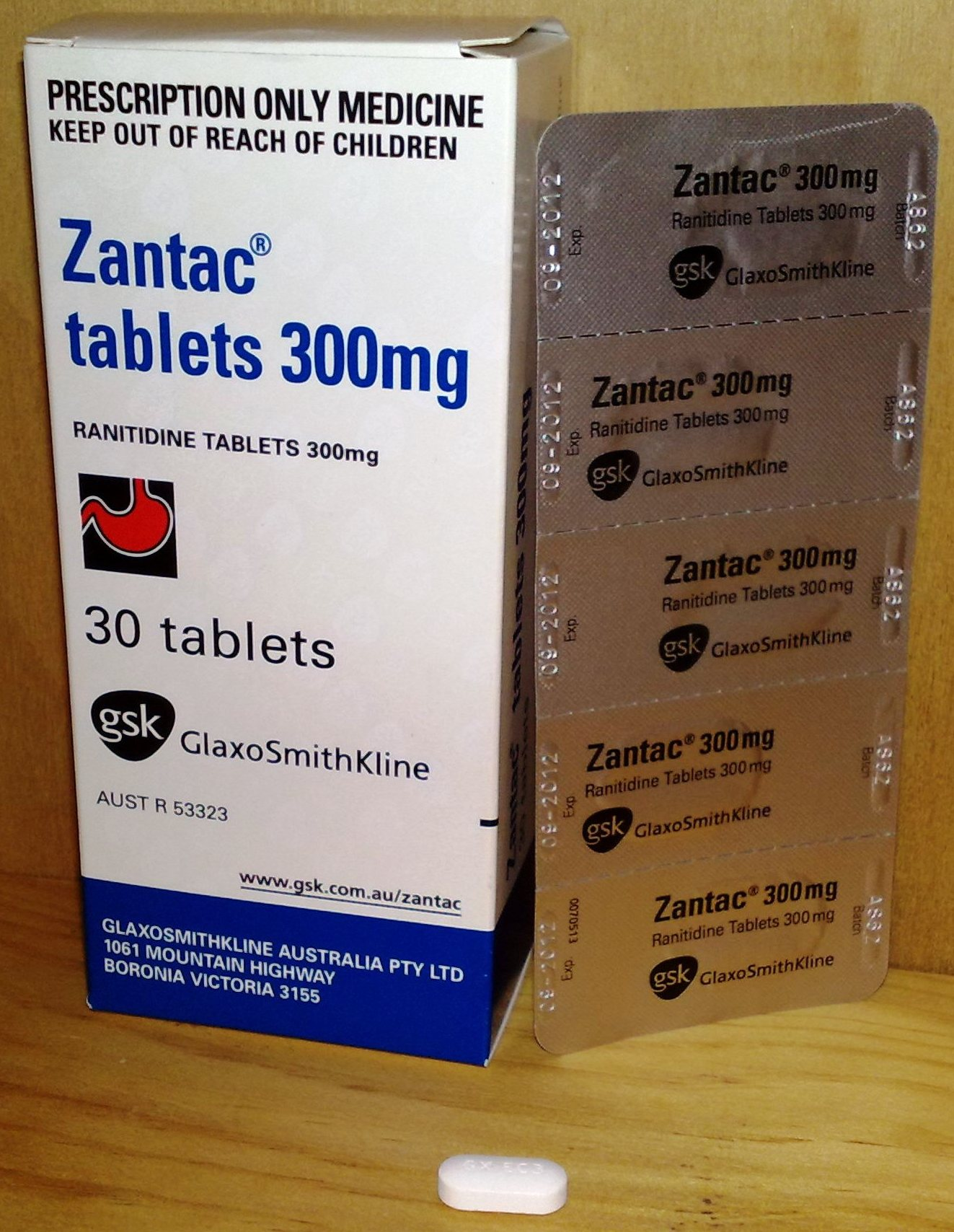
Zantac 300 mg tablets from GlaxoSmithKline (GSK) as sold in Australia

Ranitidine was first prepared in England as AH19065 by John Bradshaw in the summer of 1977 in the Ware research laboratories of Allen and Hanburys, part of the former Glaxo organisation. Its development was a response to the first in class histamine H_{2} receptor antagonist, cimetidine, developed by Sir James Black at Smith, Kline and French, and launched in the United Kingdom as Tagamet in November 1976. Both companies eventually merged as GlaxoSmithKline (GSK), following a sequence of mergers and acquisitions, starting with the integration of Allen and Hanbury's Ltd and Glaxo to form Glaxo Group Research in 1979, and ultimately with the merger of Glaxo Wellcome and SmithKline Beecham in 2000. Ranitidine was the result of a rational drug-design process using what was by then a fairly refined model of the histamine H_{2} receptor and quantitative structure-activity relationships.

Glaxo refined the model further, by replacing the imidazole ring of cimetidine with a furan ring with a nitrogen-containing substituent, and in doing so developed ranitidine. Ranitidine was found to have a far-improved tolerability profile (i.e. fewer adverse drug reactions), longer-lasting action, and 10 times the activity of cimetidine. Ranitidine has 10% of the affinity that cimetidine has to CYP450, so it causes fewer side effects, but other H_{2} blockers famotidine and nizatidine have no CYP450 significant interactions.

Ranitidine was introduced in 1981, and was the world's biggest-selling prescription drug by 1987. Subsequently, it was largely superseded by the more effective proton-pump inhibitor (PPI) class of drugs, with omeprazole becoming the biggest-selling drug for many years. When omeprazole and ranitidine were compared in a study of 144 people with severe inflammation and erosions or ulcers of the oesophagus, 85% of those treated with omeprazole healed within eight weeks, compared with 50% of those given ranitidine. In addition, the omeprazole group reported earlier relief of heartburn symptoms.

In September 2019, the probable carcinogen N-nitrosodimethylamine (NDMA) was discovered in ranitidine products from a number of manufacturers, resulting in recalls; in April 2020, it was withdrawn from the United States market and suspended in Europe and Australia. NDMA is a possible carcinogen and has been detected as an environmental contaminant.

In 2024, ranitidine was re-approved for sale in Australia after the local sponsor of Zantac changed suppliers and tablet formulation. The new formulation was demonstrated to be stable throughout its shelf life and that nitrosamines are controlled within internationally established acceptable intake limits applied to the maximum daily dose.

== Preparations ==
Preparations of ranitidine products include oral tablets (75, 150, and 300 mg), effervescent tablets, and syrups, and injectable solutions; with doses of specific ranitidine product preparations are available over-the-counter (OTC) in various countries. In the United Kingdom, only the lowest-strength, 75-mg tablet was available to purchase without a prescription. In Australia, packs containing seven or 14 doses of the 150-mg tablet were available in supermarkets, small packs of 150-mg and 300-mg tablets were schedule 2 pharmacy medicines. Larger doses and pack sizes required a prescription. In the United States, 75- and 150-mg tablets were available OTC. In India, it is sold under multiple brand names.
