= Histamine H2 receptor =

Mammalian protein found in Homo sapiens

HRH2

Identifiers
- Aliases: HRH2, H2R, histamine receptor H2, HH2R
- External IDs: OMIM: 142703; MGI: 108482; HomoloGene: 40613; GeneCards: HRH2; OMA:HRH2 - orthologs

Gene location (Human)
Chr.	Chromosome 5 (human)
Band	5q35.2	Start	175,658,030 bp
Band	5q35.2	End	175,710,756 bp

Gene location (Mouse)
Chr.	Chromosome 13 (mouse)
Band	13 B1|13 28.4 cM	Start	54,346,148 bp
Band	13 B1|13 28.4 cM	End	54,390,199 bp
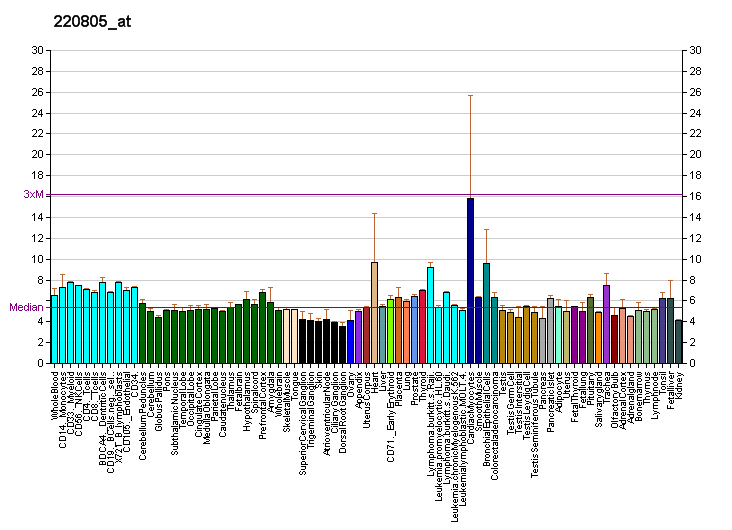
RNA expression pattern
Bgee	Human / Mouse (ortholog); Top expressed in: monocyte; blood; granulocyte; left ventricle; apex of heart; body of stomach; putamen; caudate nucleus; myocardium of left ventricle; prefrontal cortex / Top expressed in: granulocyte; internal carotid artery; epithelium of stomach; mucous cell of stomach; primary visual cortex; superior frontal gyrus; neuron; blood; decidua; dentate gyrus of hippocampal formation granule cell; More reference expression data
BioGPS	More reference expression data
Gene ontology
Molecular function	G protein-coupled receptor activity; signal transducer activity; histamine receptor activity; G protein-coupled serotonin receptor activity; neurotransmitter receptor activity
Cellular component	integral component of membrane; membrane; plasma membrane; integral component of plasma membrane; dendrite
Biological process	visual learning; epithelial cell morphogenesis; gastric acid secretion; G protein-coupled receptor signaling pathway, coupled to cyclic nucleotide second messenger; memory; toxin transport; regulation of synaptic plasticity; gastrin-induced gastric acid secretion; positive regulation of vasoconstriction; immune response; digestive tract development; signal transduction; gland development; histamine-induced gastric acid secretion; G protein-coupled receptor signaling pathway; chemical synaptic transmission; G protein-coupled serotonin receptor signaling pathway
Sources:Amigo / QuickGO
Orthologs
Species	Human	Mouse
Entrez	3274	15466
Ensembl	ENSG00000113749	ENSMUSG00000034987
UniProt	P25021	P97292
RefSeq (mRNA)	NM_001131055; NM_022304; NM_001367711; NM_001393460; NM_001393461	NM_001010973; NM_008286
RefSeq (protein)	NP_001124527; NP_001354640	NP_001010973
Location (UCSC)	Chr 5: 175.66 – 175.71 Mb	Chr 13: 54.35 – 54.39 Mb
PubMed search
- Wikidata
View/Edit Human	View/Edit Mouse

H_{2} receptors are a type of histamine receptor found in many parts of the anatomy of humans and other animals. They are positively coupled to adenylate cyclase via G_{s} alpha subunit. It is a potent stimulant of cAMP production, which leads to activation of protein kinase A. PKA functions to phosphorylate certain proteins, affecting their activity. The drug betazole is an example of a histamine H_{2} receptor agonist.

== Function ==
Histamine is a ubiquitous messenger molecule released from mast cells, enterochromaffin-like cells, and neurons. Its various actions are mediated by histamine receptors H_{1}, H_{2}, H_{3} and H_{4}. The histamine receptor H_{2} belongs to the rhodopsin-like family of G protein-coupled receptors. It is an integral membrane protein and stimulates gastric acid secretion. It also regulates gastrointestinal motility and intestinal secretion and is thought to be involved in regulating cell growth and differentiation. Histamine may play a role in penile erection.

== Tissue distribution ==
Histamine H_{2} receptors are expressed in the following tissues:

Peripheral tissues

- Gastric parietal cells (oxyntic cells)
- Vascular smooth muscle
- Neutrophils
- Mast cells
- Heart
- Genitourinary system (uterus, bladder)

Central nervous system tissues

- Caudate–putamen
- Cerebral cortex (external layers)
- Hippocampal formation
- Dentate nucleus of the cerebellum

== Physiological responses ==
Activation of the H_{2} receptor results in the following physiological responses:

- Stimulation of gastric acid secretion (Target of anti-histaminergics (H_{2} receptors) for peptic ulcer disease and GERD)
- Smooth muscle relaxation (Experimental histamine H_{2} receptor agonist used for asthma and COPD)
- Inhibit antibody synthesis, T-cell proliferation and cytokine production
- Vasodilation – PKA activity causes phosphorylation of MLCK, decreasing its activity, resulting in MLC of myosin being dephosphorylated by MLCP and thus inhibiting contraction. The smooth muscle relaxation leads to vasodilation.
- Inhibition of neutrophil activation and chemotaxis

== See also ==
- H_{2}-receptor antagonist
- Histamine H_{1}-receptor
- Histamine H_{3}-receptor
- Histamine H_{4}-receptor
