= ATC code A02 =

ATC code A02 Drugs for acid related disorders is a therapeutic subgroup of the Anatomical Therapeutic Chemical Classification System, a system of alphanumeric codes developed by the World Health Organization (WHO) for the classification of drugs and other medical products. Subgroup A02 is part of the anatomical group A Alimentary tract and metabolism.

Codes for veterinary use (ATCvet codes) can be created by placing the letter Q in front of the human ATC code: for example, QA02.
National versions of the ATC classification may include additional codes not present in this list, which follows the WHO version.

== A02A Antacids ==
=== A02AA Magnesium compounds ===
A02AA01 Magnesium carbonate
A02AA02 Magnesium oxide
A02AA03 Magnesium peroxide
A02AA04 Magnesium hydroxide
A02AA05 Magnesium silicate
A02AA10 Combinations

=== A02AB Aluminium compounds ===
A02AB01 Aluminium hydroxide
A02AB02 Algeldrate
A02AB03 Aluminium phosphate
A02AB04 Dihydroxialumini sodium carbonate
A02AB05 Aluminium acetoacetate
A02AB06 Aloglutamol
A02AB07 Aluminium glycinate
A02AB10 Combinations

=== A02AC Calcium compounds ===
A02AC01 Calcium carbonate
A02AC02 Calcium silicate
A02AC10 Combinations

=== A02AD Combinations and complexes of aluminium, calcium and magnesium compounds ===
A02AD01 Ordinary salt combinations
A02AD02 Magaldrate
A02AD03 Almagate
A02AD04 Hydrotalcite
A02AD05 Almasilate

=== A02AF Antacids with antiflatulents ===
A02AF01 Magaldrate and antiflatulents
A02AF02 Ordinary salt combinations and antiflatulents

== A02B Drugs for peptic ulcer and gastro-oesophageal reflux disease (GORD) ==
=== A02BA H2-receptor antagonists ===
A02BA01 Cimetidine
A02BA02 Ranitidine
A02BA03 Famotidine
A02BA04 Nizatidine
A02BA05 Niperotidine
A02BA06 Roxatidine
A02BA07 Ranitidine bismuth citrate
A02BA08 Lafutidine
A02BA51 Cimetidine, combinations
A02BA53 Famotidine, combinations

=== A02BB Prostaglandins ===
A02BB01 Misoprostol
A02BB02 Enprostil

=== A02BC Proton pump inhibitors ===
A02BC01 Omeprazole
A02BC02 Pantoprazole
A02BC03 Lansoprazole
A02BC04 Rabeprazole
A02BC05 Esomeprazole
A02BC06 Dexlansoprazole
A02BC07 Dexrabeprazole
A02BC08 Vonoprazan
A02BC09 Tegoprazan
A02BC10 Fexuprazan
A02BC11 Ilaprazole
A02BC12 Zastaprazan
A02BC51 Omeprazole, combinations
A02BC53 Lansoprazole, combinations
A02BC54 Rabeprazole, combinations

=== A02BD Combinations for eradication of Helicobacter pylori ===
A02BD01 Omeprazole, amoxicillin and metronidazole
A02BD02 Lansoprazole, tetracycline and metronidazole
A02BD03 Lansoprazole, amoxicillin and metronidazole
A02BD04 Pantoprazole, amoxicillin and clarithromycin
A02BD05 Omeprazole, amoxicillin and clarithromycin
A02BD06 Esomeprazole, amoxicillin and clarithromycin
A02BD07 LansoprazoleVonoprazan/amoxicillin, amoxicillin and clarithromycin
A02BD08 Bismuth subcitrate, tetracycline and metronidazole
A02BD09 Lansoprazole, clarithromycin and tinidazole
A02BD10 Lansoprazole, amoxicillin and levofloxacin
A02BD11 Pantoprazole, amoxicillin, clarithromycin and metronidazole
A02BD12 Rabeprazole, amoxicillin and clarithromycin
A02BD13 Rabeprazole, amoxicillin and metronidazole
A02BD14 Vonoprazan, amoxicillin and clarithromycin
A02BD15 Vonoprazan, amoxicillin and metronidazole
A02BD16 Omeprazole, amoxicillin and rifabutin
A02BD17 Vonoprazan and amoxicillin

=== A02BX Other drugs for peptic ulcer and gastro-oesophageal reflux disease (GORD) ===
A02BX01 Carbenoxolone
A02BX02 Sucralfate
A02BX03 Pirenzepine
A02BX04 Methiosulfonium chloride
A02BX05 Bismuth subcitrate
A02BX06 Proglumide
A02BX07 Gefarnate
A02BX08 Sulglicotide
A02BX09 Acetoxolone
A02BX10 Zolimidine
A02BX11 Troxipide
A02BX12 Bismuth subnitrate
A02BX13 Alginic acid
A02BX14 Rebamipide
A02BX15 Teprenone
A02BX16 Irsogladine
A02BX51 Carbenoxolone, combinations excluding psycholeptics
A02BX71 Carbenoxolone, combinations with psycholeptics
A02BX77 Gefarnate, combinations with psycholeptics

== A02X Other drugs for acid related disorders ==
Empty group
