= C17H26N2O3 =

The molecular formula C_{17}H_{26}N_{2}O_{3} (molar mass: 306.4 g/mol) may refer to:

- Soquinolol
- Roxatidine
