= Almasilate =

Names
- IUPAC name Magnesium aluminosilicate hydrate
- Other names Dianeusine

Identifiers
CAS Number	71205-22-6
3D model (JSmol)	Interactive image
ChemSpider	32700646
DrugBank	DB13595
KEGG	D07419
PubChem CID	156054
UNII	OZQ8O62H53
CompTox Dashboard (EPA)	DTXSID30221403
- InChI: InChI=XFKLULFTFNRQOX-UHFFFAOYSA-N Key: 1S/2Al.Mg.2O4Si.H2O/c;;;2*1-5(2,3)4;/h;;;;;1H2/q2*+3;+2;2*-4;
- SMILES: O.[O-][Si]([O-])([O-])[O-].[O-][Si]([O-])([O-])[O-].[Mg+2].[Al+3].[Al+3]

Properties
Chemical formula	Al_{2}MgO_{8}Si_{2}

Pharmacology
ATC code	A02AD05 (WHO)
- Except where otherwise noted, data are given for materials in their standard state (at 25 °C [77 °F], 100 kPa). verify (what is ?) Infobox references

Almasilate is an antacid. It is available in Japan as a mixture with calcium carbonate, and sodium bicarbonate as a non-prescription medication. It is also sold in Taiwan, Germany, and Spain.
