= Aluminium acetoacetate =

Chemical compound

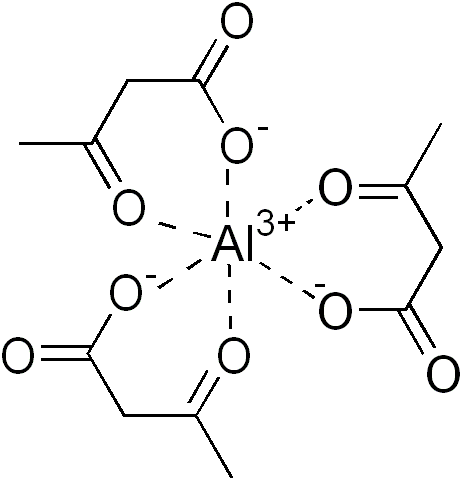

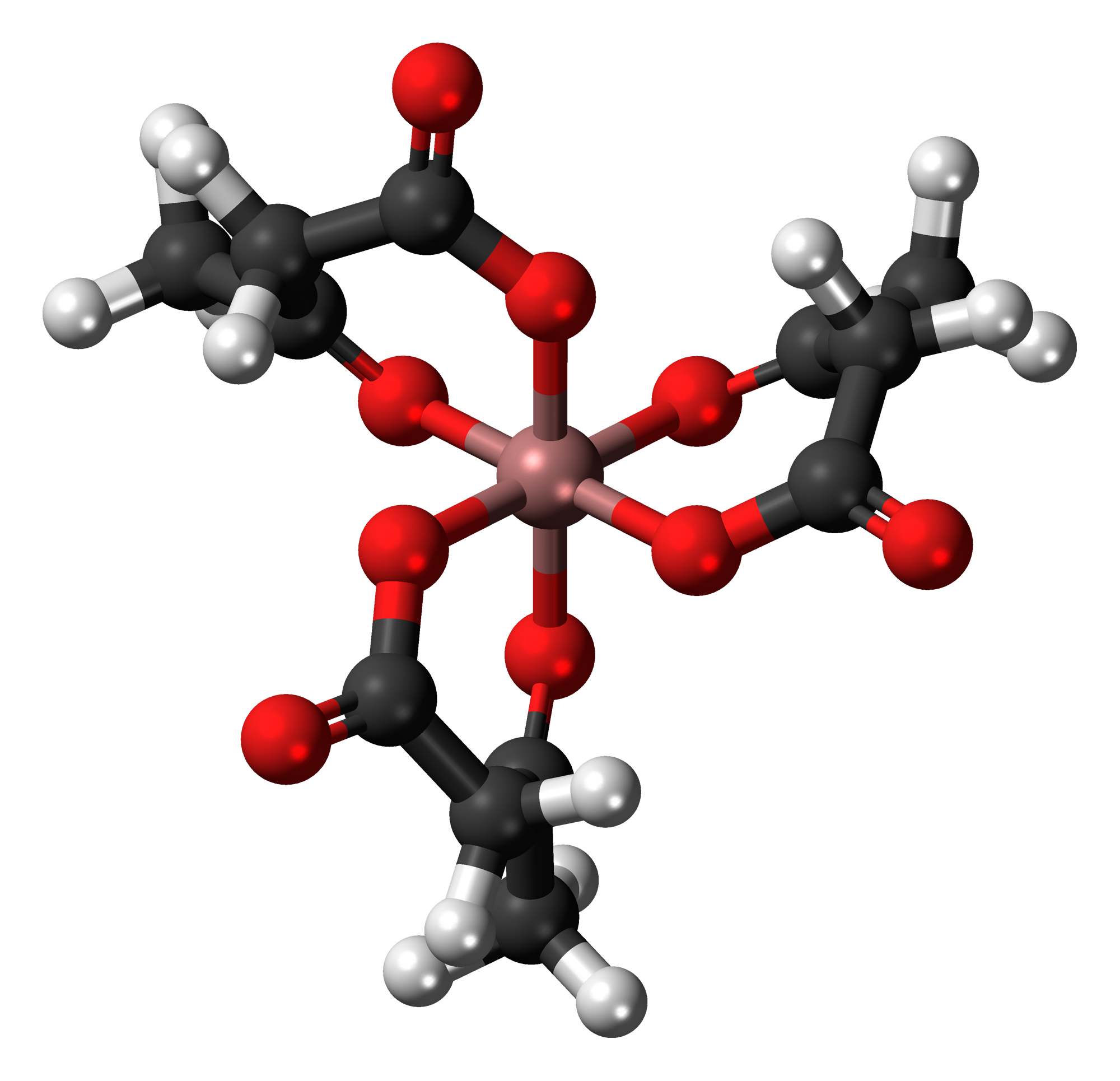

Clinical data
- ATC code: A02AB05 (WHO)

Identifiers
- IUPAC name: Aluminium 1-ethoxy-3-oxobut-1-en-1-olate
- CAS Number: 19022-77-6
- PubChem CID: 21584777
- DrugBank: DB13280
- ChemSpider: 10670077
- UNII: 5W12C1HF5I
- KEGG: C17688
- ChEBI: CHEBI:138819
- ChEMBL: ChEMBL3707335
- CompTox Dashboard (EPA): DTXSID101046157
- ECHA InfoCard: 100.120.537

Chemical and physical data
- Formula: C_{18}H_{27}AlO_{9}
- Molar mass: 414.387 g·mol^{−1}
- 3D model (JSmol): Interactive image
- SMILES: CC(=O)CC(=O)[O-].CC(=O)CC(=O)[O-].CC(=O)CC(=O)[O-].[Al+3]
- InChI: InChI=1S/3C4H6O3.Al/c3*1-3(5)2-4(6)7;/h3*2H2,1H3,(H,6,7);/q;;;+3/p-3; Key:DEVXQDKRGJCZMV-UHFFFAOYSA-K

Aluminium acetoacetate is an antacid with the chemical formula C_{18}H_{27}AlO_{9}.
