= Magaldrate =

Pharmaceutical drug

- $\ce{[Al^{3+}][Mg^{2+}]2[HO^{-}]7[H2O]}$

Clinical data
- Trade names: Magalat
- AHFS/Drugs.com: Micromedex Detailed Consumer Information
- MedlinePlus: a682683
- Pregnancy category: C
- Routes of administration: Oral
- ATC code: A02AD02 (WHO) A02AF01 (WHO) (combination with antiflatulents)

Legal status
- Legal status: In general: Over-the-counter (OTC)

Pharmacokinetic data
- Bioavailability: Negligible
- Metabolism: Nil
- Excretion: Fecal and renal

Identifiers
- IUPAC name: Magnesium aluminate monohydrate
- CAS Number: 74978-16-8
- PubChem CID: 6336542
- ChemSpider: 4891688
- UNII: 6V88E24N5T
- CompTox Dashboard (EPA): DTXSID00157184
- ECHA InfoCard: 100.115.465

Chemical and physical data
- Formula: AlMg_{2}(OH)_{7}·H_{2}O
- Molar mass: 212.66 g/mol
- InChI: InChI=1S/Al.Mg.2H2O/h;;2*1H2/p-1; Key:SXSTVPXRZQQBKQ-UHFFFAOYSA-M

Magaldrate (INN) is a common antacid drug that is used for the treatment of duodenal and gastric ulcers, esophagitis from gastroesophageal reflux.

== Development ==
Magaldrat was first synthesized by the German chemist Gunther Hallmann and patented on February 2, 1960, by Byk Gulden Lomberg Chemische Fabrik (Germany). In 1983, the active substance was registered as the original drug Riopan.

== Available forms ==
Magaldrate is available in the form of oral suspension or tablets.

== Pharmacology ==
Magaldrate is a hydroxymagnesium aluminate complex that is converted rapidly by gastric acid into Mg(OH)_{2} and Al(OH)_{3}, which are absorbed poorly and thus provide a sustained antacid effect.

== Interactions and adverse reactions ==
Magaldrate may negatively influence drugs like tetracyclines, benzodiazepines, and indomethacin. High doses or prolonged usage may lead to an increment of defecation and a reduction in feces consistence. In some cases it can alter the functionality of the gastrointestinal tract, occasionally provoking constipation or diarrhea.
