= C20H26N4O5S =

The molecular formula C_{20}H_{26}N_{4}O_{5}S may refer to:

- Niperotidine
- Glisolamide
