= Dawsonite =

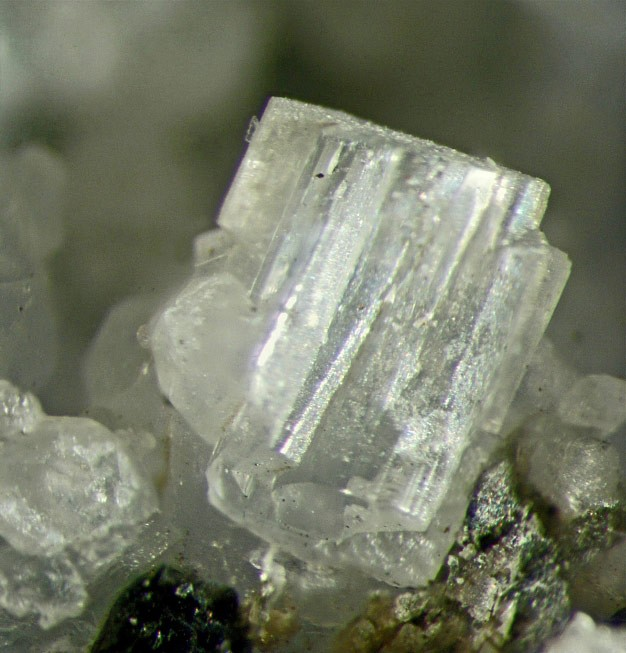
- Dawsonite from Mont Saint-Hilaire, Rouville RCM, Montérégie, Québec, Canada

General
- Category: Carbonate minerals
- Formula: NaAlCO_{3}(OH)_{2}
- IMA symbol: Dws
- Strunz classification: 5.BB.10
- Dana classification: 16a.03.08.01
- Crystal system: Orthorhombic
- Crystal class: Dipyramidal (mmm); H-M symbol: (2/m 2/m 2/m)
- Space group: Imam

Identification
- Formula mass: 144.00 g/mol
- Color: white
- Crystal habit: encrustations or radial
- Cleavage: perfect on {110}
- Fracture: uneven
- Mohs scale hardness: 3
- Luster: vitreous
- Streak: white
- Diaphaneity: transparent
- Specific gravity: 2.436
- Refractive index: n_{α} = 1.466 n_{β} = 1.542 n_{γ} = 1.596
- Birefringence: δ = 0.130
- 2V angle: 77°

Dawsonite is a mineral composed of sodium aluminium carbonate hydroxide, chemical formula NaAlCO_{3}(OH)_{2}. It crystallizes in the orthorhombic crystal system. It is not mined for ore. It was discovered in 1874 during the construction of the Redpath Museum in a feldspathic dike on the campus of McGill University on the Island of Montreal, Canada. It is named after geologist Sir John William Dawson (1820–1899).

The type material is preserved in the collection of the Redpath Museum.

== See also ==
- Dihydroxialumini sodium carbonate, the commercial (artificial) form, used as an antacid
- List of minerals
- List of minerals named after people
