= Aloglutamol =

Chemical compound

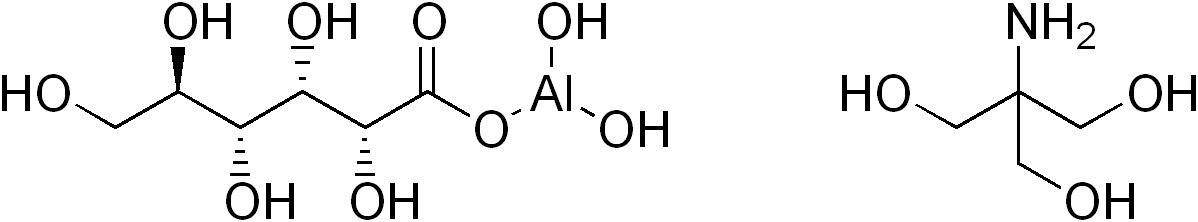

Clinical data
- Other names: Tasto; trometamolgluconate aluminium
- ATC code: A02AB06 (WHO)

Identifiers
- IUPAC name: Dihydroxyaluminium gluconate; Tris(hydroxymethyl)aminomethane (1:1)
- CAS Number: 13755-41-4
- ChemSpider: 28426726
- UNII: I670EI8M2N
- CompTox Dashboard (EPA): DTXSID601027584

Chemical and physical data
- Formula: C_{10}H_{24}NO_{12}
- Molar mass: 350.297 g·mol^{−1}
- 3D model (JSmol): Interactive image
- SMILES: C([C@H]([C@H]([C@@H]([C@H](C(=O)O[Al](O)O)O)O)O)O)O.C(C(CO)(CO)N)O
- InChI: InChI=1S/C6H12O7.C4H11NO3.Al.2H2O/c7-1-2(8)3(9)4(10)5(11)6(12)13;5-4(1-6,2-7)3-8;;;/h2-5,7-11H,1H2,(H,12,13);6-8H,1-3,5H2;;2*1H2/q;;+3;;/p-3/t2-,3-,4+,5-;;;;/m1..../s1; Key:GJJYZOBRHIMORS-GQOAHPRESA-K

Aloglutamol is an antacid, an aluminium compound. It is a salt of aluminium, gluconic acid, and tris. It is usually given orally in doses of 0.5 to 1 g. Proprietary names include Altris, Pyreses, Tasto and Sabro.
