= C9H7Cl2N5 =

The molecular formula C_{9}H_{7}Cl_{2}N_{5} (molar mass: 256.091 g/mol, exact mass: 255.0079 u) may refer to:

- Irsogladine, or DCPDAT
- Lamotrigine
