= Vonoprazan/amoxicillin =

Combination medication

Combination of
- Vonoprazan: Potassium-competitive acid blocker
- Amoxicillin: Beta-lactam antibiotic

Clinical data
- Trade names: Voquezna Dual Pak
- License data: US DailyMed: Voquezna
- Routes of administration: By mouth
- ATC code: A02BD17 (WHO)

Legal status
- Legal status: US: ℞-only

Vonoprazan/amoxicillin, sold under the brand name Voquezna Dual Pak among others, is a co-packaged medication used for the treatment of Helicobacter pylori (H. pylori) infection. It contains vonoprazan (as the fumarate), a potassium-competitive acid blocker and amoxicillin, a beta-lactam antibiotic. It is taken by mouth.

The co-packaged medication was approved for medical use in the United States in May 2022.

== Medical uses ==
Vonoprazan/amoxicillin is indicated for the treatment of H. pylori infection in adults.

== Research ==
The dual therapy of using vonoprazan with amoxicillin has been investigated for the treatment of H. pylori infection and also compared with the triple therapy of using vonoprazan, amoxicillin, and clarithromycin for the eradication of H. pylori infection. Both treatments have been found to be effective. As of 2024, evidence indicates that vonoprazan/amoxicillin therapy has similar efficacy to bismuth-containing quadruple therapies in eliminating H. pylori.
