= Omeprazole/amoxicillin/rifabutin =

Combination drug

Combination of
- Omeprazole: Proton-pump inhibitor
- Amoxicillin: Penicillin-class antibacterial
- Rifabutin: Rifamycin antibacterial

Clinical data
- Trade names: Talicia
- AHFS/Drugs.com: Professional Drug Facts
- License data: US DailyMed: Omeprazole_magnesium,_amoxicillin_and_rifabutin
- Routes of administration: By mouth
- ATC code: A02BD16 (WHO)

Legal status
- Legal status: US: ℞-only

Identifiers
- KEGG: D11858

Omeprazole/amoxicillin/rifabutin, sold under the brand name Talicia, is a fixed-dose combination medication used for the treatment of Helicobacter pylori infection. It is taken by mouth.

It was approved for medical use in the United States in November 2019.
