= Tritec =

Tritec may refer to:

- A joint venture between Chrysler and BMW/Rover to produce the Tritec car engine
- The brand name for ranitidine bismuth citrate, a drug used to treat Helicobacter pylori infections
