= Ilaprazole =

Stomach acid suppressing medication

Clinical data
- Trade names: Noltec
- Routes of administration: By mouth
- ATC code: A02BC11 (WHO)

Identifiers
- IUPAC name: 2-[(RS)-[(4-methoxy-3-methylpyridin-2-yl)methyl]sulfinyl]-5-(1H-pyrrol-1-yl)-1H-benzimidazole
- CAS Number: 172152-36-2
- PubChem CID: 214351
- ChemSpider: 185839
- UNII: 776Q6XX45J
- KEGG: D13013
- ChEMBL: ChEMBL2106370
- CompTox Dashboard (EPA): DTXSID10870115

Chemical and physical data
- Formula: C_{19}H_{18}N_{4}O_{2}S
- Molar mass: 366.44 g·mol^{−1}
- 3D model (JSmol): Interactive image
- SMILES: Cc1c(OC)ccnc1CS(=O)c2[nH]c3ccc(cc3n2)n4cccc4
- InChI: InChI=1S/C19H18N4O2S/c1-13-17(20-8-7-18(13)25-2)12-26(24)19-21-15-6-5-14(11-16(15)22-19)23-9-3-4-10-23/h3-11H,12H2,1-2H3,(H,21,22); Key:HRRXCXABAPSOCP-UHFFFAOYSA-N

Ilaprazole (trade name Noltec) is a proton pump inhibitor (PPI) used in the treatment of dyspepsia, peptic ulcer disease (PUD), gastroesophageal reflux disease (GORD/GERD) and duodenal ulcer.

It is available in strengths of 5, 10, and 20 mg.

Clinical studies show that ilaprazole is at least as potent a PPI as omeprazole when taken in equivalent doses. Studies also showed that ilaprazole significantly prevented the development of reflux oesophagitis.

Ilaprazole is developed by Il-Yang Pharmaceutical (Korea), and is still under clinical trials with US FDA. It has launched in Korea and China for the treatment of gastric ulcer, duodenal ulcer, gastroesophageal reflux disease and erosive esophagitis.

Ilaprazole is sold in Mexico by Chinoin Pharmaceuticals under the brand name Norutec.
