= AstraZeneca plc v Commission =

Competition law case

AstraZeneca AB and AstraZeneca plc v Commission
- Court: Court of Justice of the EU
- Citation: (2012) C-457/10 P

Case history
- Prior action: (2010) T-321/05

AstraZeneca AB and AstraZeneca plc v Commission (2012) C-457/10 P is an EU competition law case, concerning monopoly and abuse of a dominant position.

== Facts ==
AstraZeneca plc misrepresented the dates of invention of a stomach ulcer drug, omeprazole (its brand was Losec), to national patent offices and courts. It also deregistered a capsule version, to get longer patent protection, and thus prevent other companies producing generic versions of the drug.

The Commission fined AstraZeneca €60 million. AstraZeneca brought an action against the Commission to annul the fine.

== Judgment ==
The Court of Justice upheld the Commission's fine of €60 million based on ‘highly misleading representations with the aim of leading public authorities into error’, and depriving generic drug manufacturers of the ability to produce the drug. The fact that AstraZeneca was allowed to withdraw Losec capsules under registration procedures did not mean it was not an abuse to do so under article 102.

177 As the General Court pointed out at paragraphs 245 to 253, 279, 288 and 290 of the judgment under appeal, it is common ground that AZ, during the reference period and on all the geographical markets in question, held very large market shares which were well above those of its competitors, its position on those markets sometimes being even overwhelmingly strong. The General Court was therefore fully entitled to hold, at paragraphs 244, 245, 253 and 278 of that judgment, that the Commission, in its detailed analysis of the competitive conditions which took into account a range of factors, could rely specifically on AZ’s generally very large market shares as an indicator of its market power, which was out of all comparison to those of the other market players.

178 In addition, contrary to what the EFPIA claims, the General Court did not omit to examine whether AZ’s large market share allowed it to behave independently of its competitors and its customers and whether AZ’s market power was excluded or mitigated on account of the State’s role as price regulator and buyer with a monopsonist power in respect of medicinal products issued on prescription. On the contrary, it carried out, at paragraphs 256 to 268 of the judgment under appeal, a particularly detailed analysis in that regard.

179 In that context, the General Court held, inter alia, at paragraphs 256 to 260 of that judgment, that, although the price or reimbursement level are the result of a decision adopted by the public authorities, the capacity of a pharmaceutical undertaking to obtain a higher price or reimbursement level varies according to the added and innovative value of the product, which enabled AZ, as the first producer to offer a PPI whose therapeutic value was much higher than that of H2 blockers, to obtain from the public authorities a higher price as against existing products and ‘me-too’ products.

180 The General Court furthermore observed, at paragraphs 262 and 264 of that judgment, that the health systems which characterise markets for pharmaceutical products tend in particular to reinforce the market power of pharmaceutical companies offering new products with an added value, since costs of medicines are fully or largely covered by social security systems, which to a significant extent makes demand inelastic. It explained in this connection that, vis-à-vis undertakings which enjoy first-mover status, the reimbursements paid by social security systems, first, are set at relatively high levels in comparison with ‘me-too’ products, despite the attempts by public authorities to reduce health costs with a view to compensating for the limited sensitivity of prescribing doctors and patients to the high prices of medicinal products and, secondly, enable the pharmaceutical company which enjoys such status to set its price at a high level without having to worry about patients and doctors switching to other less costly products.

181 Accordingly, the General Court was fully entitled to hold, at paragraphs 261 and 266 of the judgment under appeal, that the fact that AZ was able to maintain much higher market shares than those of its competitors while charging prices higher than those charged for other PPIs was a relevant factor showing that AZ’s behaviour was not, to an appreciable extent, subject to competitive constraints from its competitors, its customers and, ultimately, consumers.

182 It follows from all the foregoing that this ground of appeal must be dismissed as unfounded.

== See also ==
- EU law
- EU competition law
