= Almirall =

Spanish pharmaceutical and chemical manufacturer

Almirall, S.A.

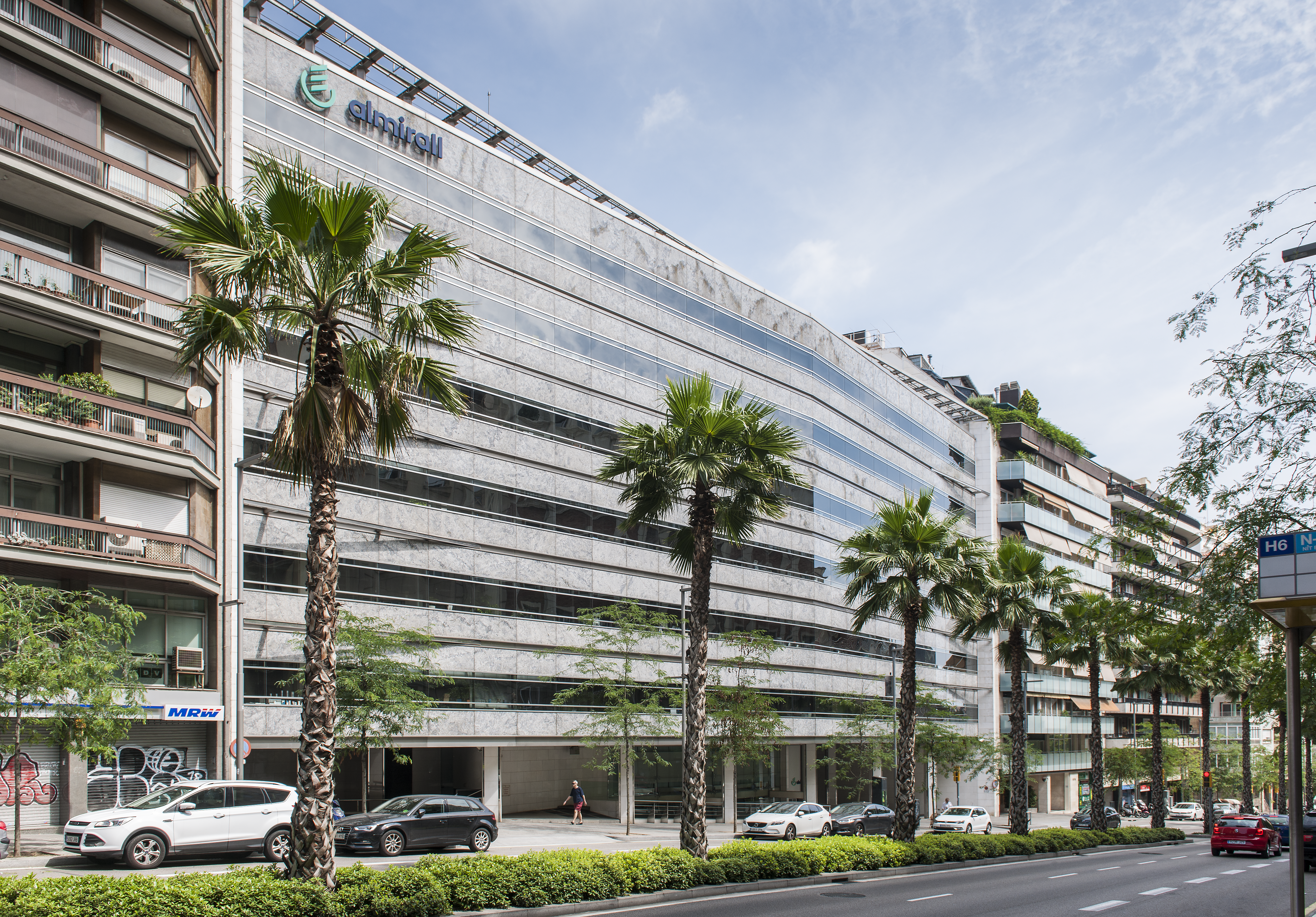
- Type: Sociedad Anónima
- Traded as: BMAD: ALM; IBEX Medium Cap
- ISIN: ES0157097017
- Founded: 1944
- Founder: Antonio Gallardo Carreras
- Headquarters: Ronda del General Mitre, 151; 08022 Barcelona; Spain
- Area served: International
- Products: Ebglyss, Ilumetri, Wynzora, Klisyri, Seysara, Ebastel, Monodox, Acticlate, Almogran, Tesavel & Efficib, Solaraze, Airtal, Decoderm, Cordran, Almax, Parapres, Balneum, Sativex, Cleboril, Monovo, Actikerall.
- Revenue: ▲€898.8 million (2023)
- Net income: ▲€33.5 million (2022)
- Total assets: ▲€2.302 billion (2022)
- Number of employees: ▼1,904 (2023)
- Subsidiaries: Arax Co., Ltd. (Japan)
- Website: www.almirall.com

Almirall, S.A. is a Spanish pharmaceutical company dedicated to medical dermatology, with headquarters in Barcelona, founded in 1944.

In 2023, the company generated total revenues of €898.8 million and was the leading European company in medical dermatology.

With approximately 1,904 employees (2023), it has a direct presence in 20 countries through its 15 subsidiaries in Europe and the USA.

== History ==
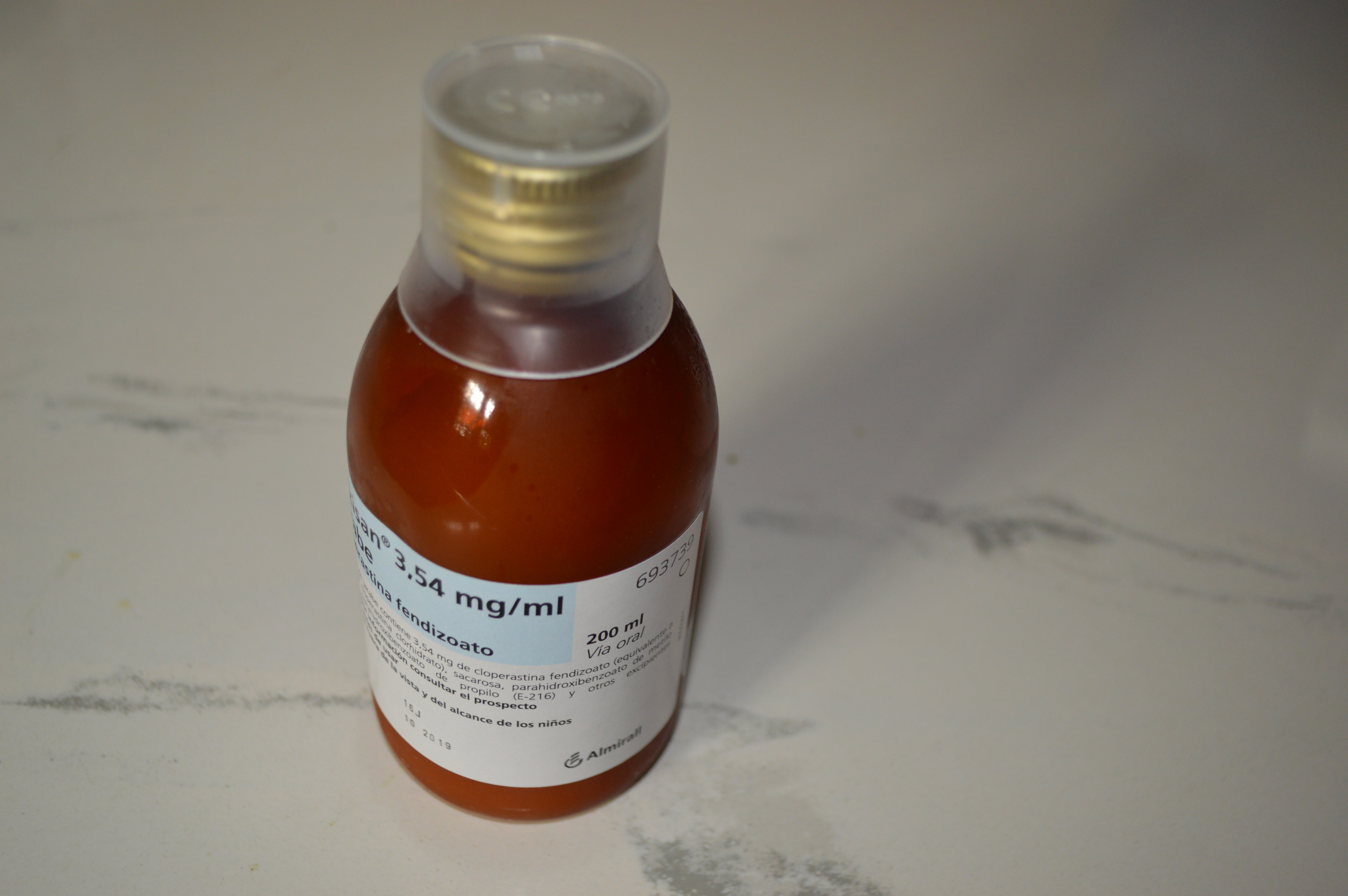
Vial containing cloperastine fendizoate produced by Almirall.

=== Early history ===
Almirall SA was founded in 1944 in Spain. In 1979, the company launched gastroprokinetic clebopride in Spain, the first product from the company's internal R&D team. In 1984, the business launched antacid product, almagate, in Spain, as well as anti-inflammatory piketoprofen in 1985 and antihistamine ebastine and cinitapride in 1985. In the same year, Almirall opened its first subsidiary, based in Belgium. In 1992 the company launched aceclofenac and a year later opened its second foreign subsidiary, in Portugal. The company's new headquarters were opened in Barcelona, in 1994. In 1997 Almirall and Prodesfarma merged their interests.

=== Further expansion ===
In 2000 the FDA approved anti-migraine agent almotriptan. A year later the company opened its Mexican subsidiary as well as acquiring its French affiliate. Beginning in 2002, Almirall opened a series of European-based subsidiaries; Italy (2002), Germany (2003), Austria, Poland, the United Kingdom, Ireland and Switzerland (2008), Nordic Countries (2010) and Netherlands (2013).

In 2005 the business acquired the commercial rights for Sativex in Europe for the treatment of spasticity associated to multiple sclerosis. In 2006, the company opened its new R&D Centre based in Sant Feliu de Llobregat as well as the acquisition of the Centre of Excellence for Inhalation Technology.

In 2007, the company floated on the Spanish stock market, as well as acquiring European dermatology specialist, Hermal. The company also acquired a portfolio of eight products from Shire plc.

In 2011, Almirall launched Actikerall prescribed for the local treatment of actinic keratosis.

In 2012, Almirall opened its first North America subsidiary, based in Canada and launched aclidinium, prescribed for chronic obstructive pulmonary disease (COPD), in Europe under the brand Eklira Genuair and Bretaris Genuair and in the United States under the brand Tudorza Pressair. The business also launched Monovo, for the treatment of inflammatory skin diseases such as psoriasis.

=== Medical dermatology ===
Almirall began a concentrated focus on medical dermatology in 2013, following the acquisition of another specialist dermatology company, Aqua Pharmaceuticals. The company launched linaclotide in Europe (Constella) for irritable bowel syndrome with constipation (IBS-C) and opened its Netherlands subsidiary.

In 2014 Almirall divested its rights to its respiratory franchise to Astrazeneca focussing on dermatology, later in 2015 declaring its strategic intention to become a leading pharmaceutical company in the field of dermatology and continuing with its expansion by acquiring Poli Group Holding and ThermiGen LLC in 2016.

In May 2022, a new generational change took place within the founding family, with the replacement of Jorge Gallardo Ballart by his son Carlos Gallardo Piqué at the head of the non-executive presidency of the company. Six months later, Carlos Gallardo also assumed the executive management.

== Activities ==
Almirall collaborates with various public and private entities, such as the Centro Superior de Investigaciones Científicas (CSIC), the Instituto de Investigación Biomédica and the Parc Científic de Barcelona in Spain. Highlighted among the international alliances are those with the Imperial College London (United Kingdom) and the National Institute of Health (NIH) in the United States. Almirall participated in the creation of the Barcelona Respiratory Network Foundation. In Europe, the company has contributed in several projects with the Innovative Medicines Initiative (IMI).

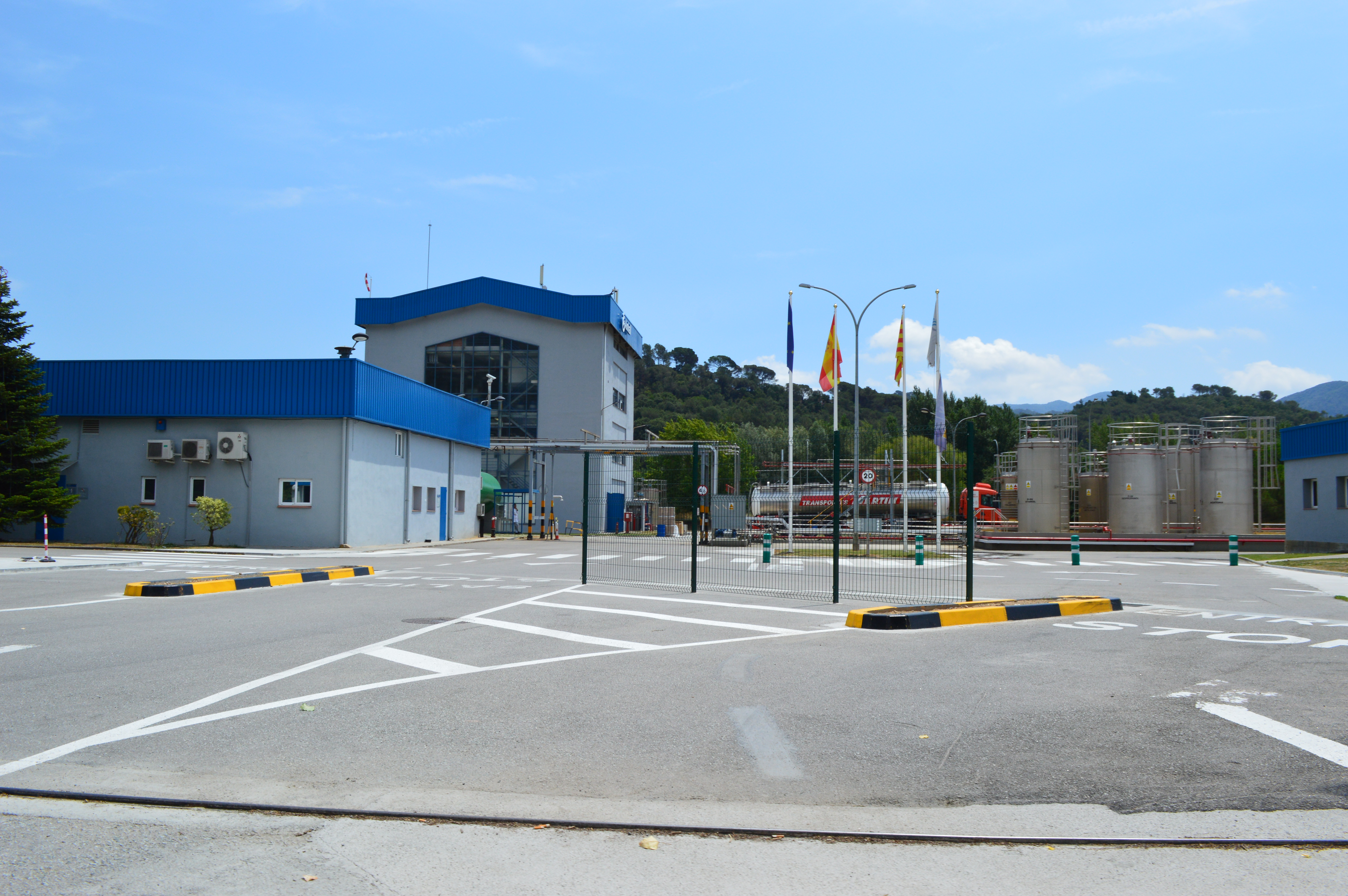
Almirall chemical plant near Sant Celoni, Spain.

== Centres ==
The R&D centre in Sant Feliu de Llobregat (Barcelona), houses the departments involved in all stages of R&D, as well as the development of new chemical entities. The Reinbek Centre of Excellence for Dermatology specializes in the development of new formulas for the treatment of skin diseases.

The company also has three production centres: two in Spain, the pharmaceutical plant in Sant Andreu de la Barca (Barcelona) and the pharmaceutical and chemical plant in Sant Celoni (Barcelona); and a pharmaceutical plant in Germany (Reinbek); as well as 13 affiliates in Germany, Austria, Belgium-Luxembourg, the United States, France, the Netherlands, Italy, the Nordic countries, Poland, Portugal, the United Kingdom-Ireland, Spain, and Switzerland.

== Numbers ==
| | 2010 | 2011 | 2012 | 2013 | 2014 | 2015 | 2016 | 2017 | 2018 | 2019 | 2020 | 2021 | 2022 | 2023 |
|---|---|---|---|---|---|---|---|---|---|---|---|---|---|---|
| Total revenue | €1002,1 MM | €873,1 MM | €900,2 MM | €825,5 MM | €1.407,4 MM | €769 MM | €859,3 MM | €755,8 MM | €811,0 MM | €908,4 MM | €814,5 MM | €836,5 MM | €878,5 MM | €898.8 MM |
| Net sales | €882.4 MM | €768.4 MM | €682.9 MM | €692.9 MM | €786.4 MM | €685 MM | €764,4 MM | €639,4 MM | €756,9 MM | €853,1 MM | €807,4 MM | €827,2 MM | €863,2 MM | €894.5 MM |
| % International sales | - | 50% | 60% | 62% | 70% | 68% | 70% | 69% | | | | | | |
| % Sales of own medicines | - | - | 59% | 64% | 70% | 67% | 77% | 68% | | | | | | |
| Investment in R&D | 16.4% of net sales | 18.8% of net sales | 23.4% of net sales | 18% of net sales | 12.8% of net sales | 9.7% of net sales | 12,9% of net sales | 13,7% of net sales | 11,6% of net sales | 10,8% of net sales | 10% of net sales | 9% de of net sales | 12% of net sales | 12% of net sales |
| Employees | 2,831 | 2,765 | 2,871 | 3,000 | 2,100 | 1,889 | 1,975 | 1.832 | 1.805 | 1.765 | 1.785 | 1.786 | 1.845 | 1.904 |
| Affiliates | 13 | 13 | 14 | 15 | 14 | 13 | 13 | 13 | 13 | 13 | 13 | 13 | 15 | 15 |
| R&D Centres | 3 | 3 | 3 | 3 | 2 | 2 | 3 | 2 | 3 | 3 | 3 | 2 | 1 | 1 |
| Production centres | 3 | 3 | 3 | 3 | 2 | 2 | 3 | 2 | 2 | 2 | 2 | 2 | 2 | 2 |

== Main products ==
| Brand | Active ingredient | Pathology |
|---|---|---|
| Ebastel | Ebastine | Allergy |
| Monodox | Doxycycline | Severe Acne |
| Acticlate | Doxycycline hyclate | Severe Acne |
| Almogran | Almotriptan | Migraine |
| Tesavel and Efficib | Sitagliptin and sitagliptin/metformin | Diabetes |
| Solaraze | Diclofenac sodium | Actinic keratosis |
| Airtal | Aceclofenac | Musculoskeletal pain |
| Decoderm | Fluprednidene | Fungal dermatitis |
| Cordran | Fludroxycortide | Inflammation and itching of the skin |
| Parapres | Candesartan | Hypertension |
| Almax | Almagate | Acidity |
| Balneum | Urea | Dry skin |
| Cleboril | Clebopride | Gastroesophageal reflux disease |
| Actikerall | 5-Fluorouracil / salicylic acid | Actinic keratosis |
| Sativex | Nabiximols | Spasticity in Multiple Sclerosis |
| Monovo | Mometasone | Psoriasis |
| Ilumetri | Tildrakizumab | Psoriasis |
| Ebglyss | Lebrikizumab | Atopic Dermatitis |
| Wynzora | Calcipotriol/Betamethasone | Psoriasis |
| Klisyri | Tirbanibulin | Actinic keratosis |
| Seysara | Sarecycline | Acne |
| Physiorelax | Helenalin | Muscle and ligament massage |

Blastoestimulina (Spain)

Rino-Ebastel (Spain)

Almax (Spain)
