= Aluminium glycinate =

Chemical compound

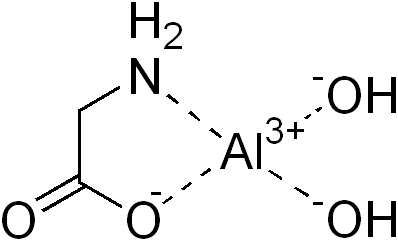

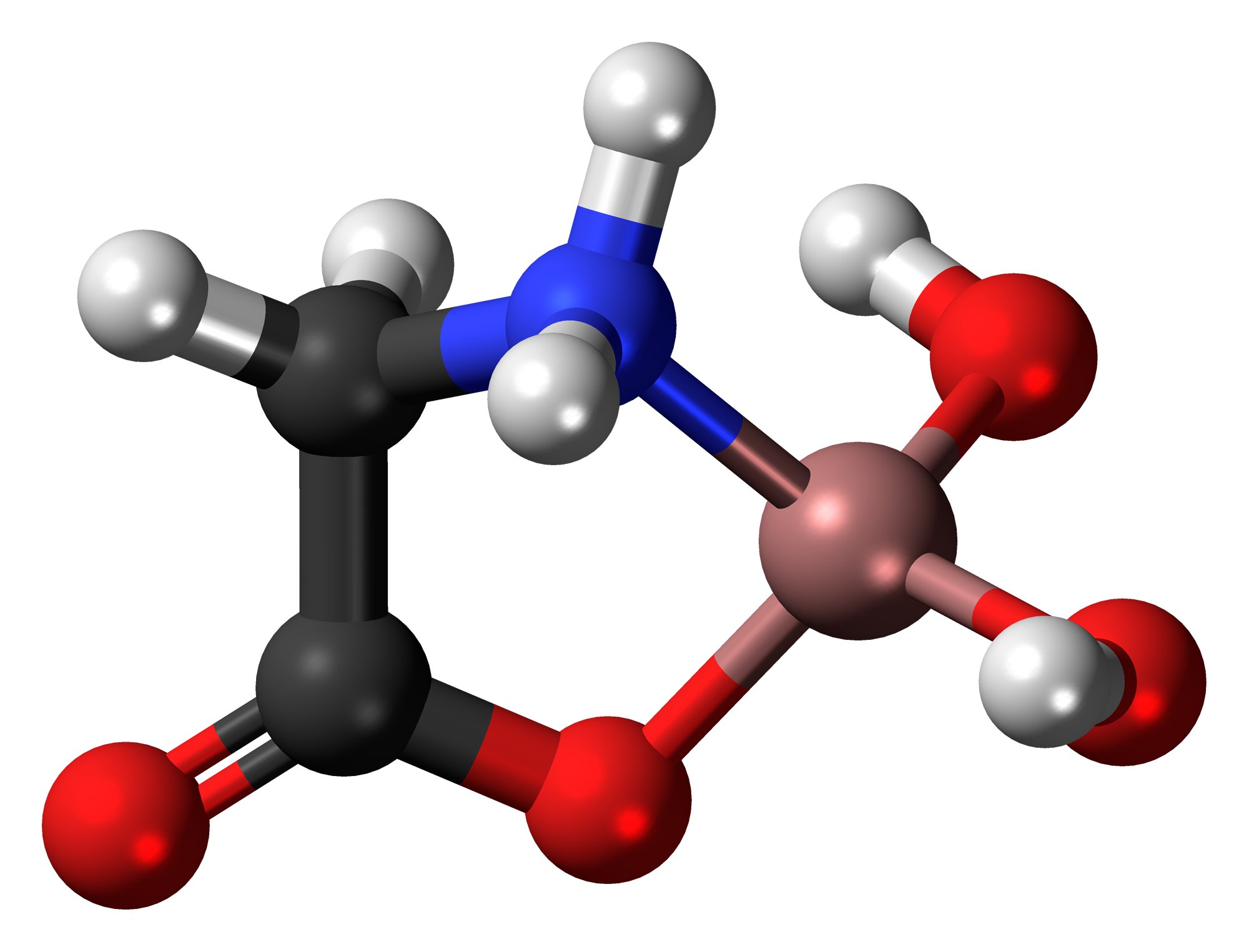

Clinical data
- AHFS/Drugs.com: International Drug Names
- ATC code: A02AB07 (WHO)

Identifiers
- IUPAC name: (2-Aminoacetyl)oxyaluminium dihydroxide
- CAS Number: 13682-92-3
- PubChem CID: 16683036
- ChemSpider: 11232879
- UNII: 1K713C615K
- CompTox Dashboard (EPA): DTXSID3044546
- ECHA InfoCard: 100.033.798

Chemical and physical data
- Formula: C_{2}H_{6}AlNO_{4}
- Molar mass: 135.055 g·mol^{−1}
- 3D model (JSmol): Interactive image
- SMILES: O[Al+]O.[O-]C(=O)CN
- InChI: InChI=1S/C2H5NO2.Al.2H2O/c3-1-2(4)5;;;/h1,3H2,(H,4,5);;2*1H2/q;+3;;/p-3; Key:BWZOPYPOZJBVLQ-UHFFFAOYSA-K

Aluminium glycinate (or dihydroxyaluminium aminoacetate) is an antacid.

== See also ==
- Aceglutamide
