= Almagate =

Chemical compound

Clinical data
- AHFS/Drugs.com: International Drug Names
- Routes of administration: Oral
- ATC code: A02AD03 (WHO)

Identifiers
- CAS Number: 66827-12-1
- PubChem CID: 71749
- ChemSpider: 64792
- UNII: 568Z59H7ZJ
- KEGG: D02821
- CompTox Dashboard (EPA): DTXSID30216935

Chemical and physical data
- Formula: Al_{2}Mg_{6}(OH)_{14}(CO_{3})_{2} · 4 H_{2}O
- Molar mass: 314.99 g/mol
- 3D model (JSmol): Interactive image
- SMILES: [Al+3].[Mg+2].[Mg+2].[Mg+2].[OH-].[OH-].[OH-].[O-]C([O-])=O.[OH-].[OH-].[OH-].[OH-].O.O
- InChI: InChI=1S/CH2O3.Al.3Mg.9H2O/c2-1(3)4;;;;;;;;;;;;;/h(H2,2,3,4);;;;;9*1H2/q;+3;3*+2;;;;;;;;;/p-9; Key:MTEOMEWVDVPTNN-UHFFFAOYSA-E

Almagate (trade name Almax) is an aluminium- and magnesium-containing antacid. It was first described in 1984.

== Adverse effects ==
Almagate is well tolerated. In a clinical trial, the most common adverse effects were diarrhea and nausea.
