= Rebamipide =

Amino acid derivative

Clinical data
- Trade names: Mucosta (JP), Rebagen (KR, CN, IN), Rebagit (RU), Ramiper, Rebamax (ID)
- AHFS/Drugs.com: International Drug Names
- Routes of administration: By mouth (tablets)
- ATC code: A02BX14 (WHO)

Identifiers
- IUPAC name: 2-[(4-chlorobenzoyl)amino]-3-(2-oxo-1H-quinolin-4-yl)propanoic acid
- CAS Number: 90098-04-7
- PubChem CID: 5042
- IUPHAR/BPS: 871
- DrugBank: DB11656
- ChemSpider: 4866
- UNII: LR583V32ZR
- KEGG: D01121
- ChEBI: CHEBI:32090
- ChEMBL: ChEMBL1697771
- CompTox Dashboard (EPA): DTXSID8045937

Chemical and physical data
- Formula: C_{19}H_{15}ClN_{2}O_{4}
- Molar mass: 370.79 g·mol^{−1}
- 3D model (JSmol): Interactive image
- SMILES: Clc1ccc(cc1)C(=O)NC(C(=O)O)CC2=CC(=O)Nc3ccccc32
- InChI: InChI=1S/C19H15ClN2O4/c20-13-7-5-11(6-8-13)18(24)22-16(19(25)26)9-12-10-17(23)21-15-4-2-1-3-14(12)15/h1-8,10,16H,9H2,(H,21,23)(H,22,24)(H,25,26); Key:ALLWOAVDORUJLA-UHFFFAOYSA-N

Rebamipide, an amino acid derivative of 2-(1H)-quinolinone, is used for mucosal protection, healing of gastroduodenal ulcers, and treatment of gastritis. It works by enhancing mucosal defense, scavenging free radicals, and temporarily activating genes encoding cyclooxygenase-2.

Studies have shown that rebamipide can fight the damaging effects of NSAIDs on the GIT mucosa, and more recently, the small intestine, but not for naproxen-induced gastric damage.

== Availability ==
Rebamipide is used in a number of Asian countries including Japan (marketed as Mucosta), South Korea, China and India (where it is marketed under the trade name Rebagen). It is also approved in Russia under the brand name Rebagit.

== Effects ==
Rebamipide increases gastric mucosal prostaglandin E2, protects gastric mucosa, thereby suppresses gastric mucosal damage and increases gastric mucus secretion and gastric mucosal blood flow, to improve hemodynamic impairment, suppress inflammation and repair the gastric mucosa. It is usually used to treat gastric ulcer and improve gastric mucosal lesion (erosion, bleeding, redness and edema) in acute gastritis and acute exacerbation period of chronic gastritis.
