= Simeticone =

Anti-foaming agent used to reduce bloating, discomfort or pain caused by excessive gas

Clinical data
- Trade names: Infacol, Gas-X, WindSetlers, others
- Other names: Simethicone (USAN US)
- AHFS/Drugs.com: Monograph
- Pregnancy category: C
- Routes of administration: Oral
- Drug class: Anti-foaming agent; surfactant; antiflatulent
- ATC code: A03AX13 (WHO)

Legal status
- Legal status: US: OTC

Pharmacokinetic data
- Bioavailability: None
- Protein binding: 0%
- Metabolism: Not metabolized
- Elimination half-life: N/A
- Excretion: Feces

Identifiers
- IUPAC name: Poly(dimethylsiloxane), silicon dioxide
- CAS Number: 8050-81-5
- PubChem CID: 6433516
- DrugBank: DB09512
- ChemSpider: None
- ChEMBL: ChEMBL1200838
- CompTox Dashboard (EPA): DTXSID00904918
- ECHA InfoCard: 100.107.016

Chemical and physical data
- Formula: (C_{2}H_{6}OSi)_{n} · (SiO_{2})_{m}
- Molar mass: Variable

Simeticone (INN), also known as simethicone (USAN), is an anti-foaming agent used to reduce bloating, discomfort or pain caused by excessive gas.

== Medical uses ==
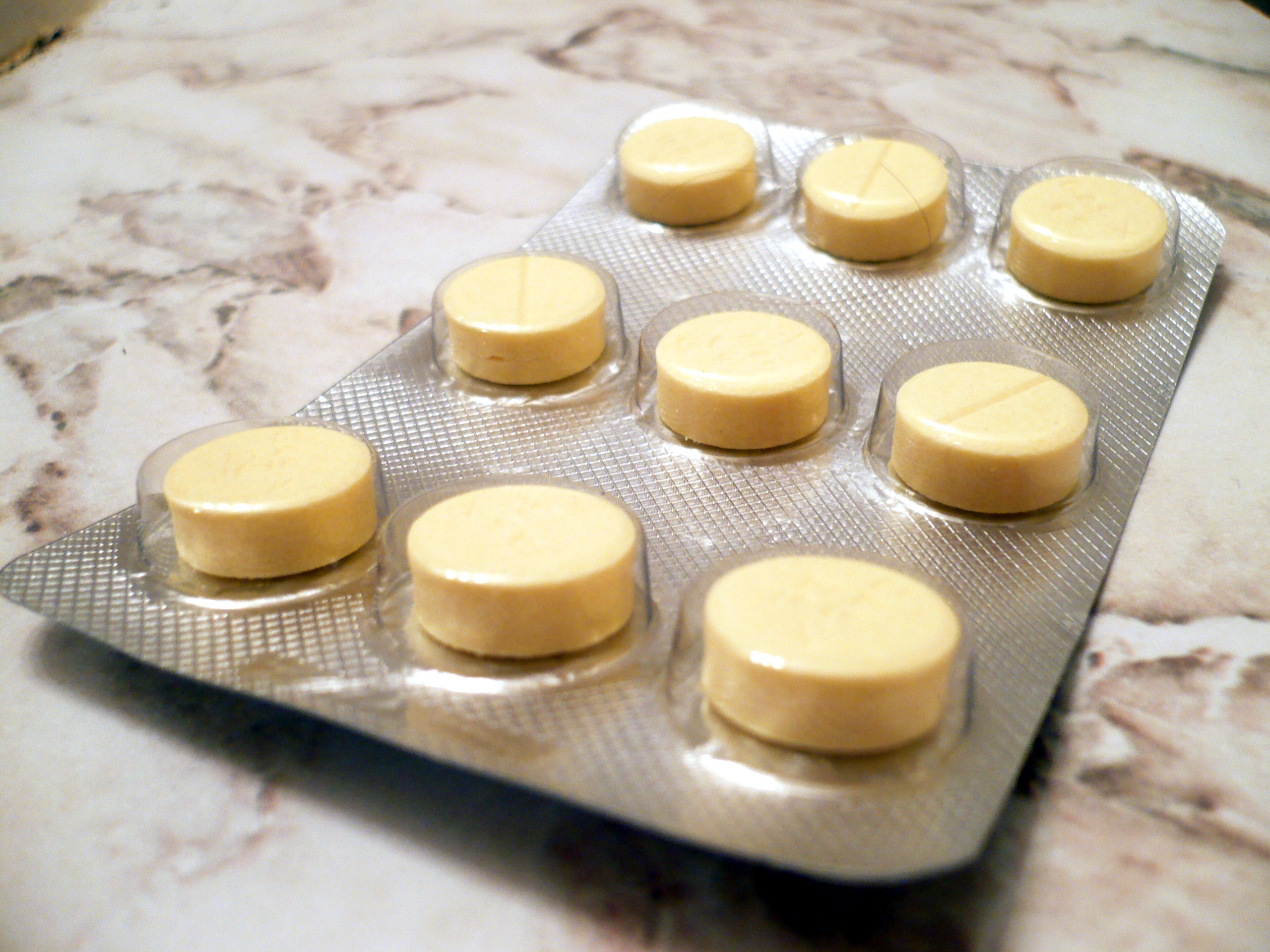
Simethicone tablets

Simethicone is used to relieve the symptoms of excessive gas in the gastrointestinal tract, namely bloating, burping, and flatulence. While there is a lack of conclusive evidence that simethicone is effective for this use,⁣ studies have shown that it can relieve symptoms of functional dyspepsia and functional bloating.

It has not been fully established that simethicone is useful to treat colic in babies, and it is not recommended for this purpose. A study in the United Kingdom reported that according to parental perception simethicone helped infant colic in some cases.

Simethicone can also be used for suspected postoperative abdominal discomfort in infants.

== Side effects ==
Simethicone does not have any known serious or severe side effects. Two uncommon side effects (occurring in 1 in 100 to 1 in 1,000 patients) are constipation and nausea.

Though poorly documented, some studies show a possible negative interaction between simethicone and levothyroxine (synthetic T_{4}), meaning it can possibly bind levothyroxine in the GI tract and hence reduce its absorption leaving the patient prone to clinical manifestations of hypothyroidism. It is important to mention the long T_{1/2} of levothyroxine which makes the phenomenon a matter of at least a week of using levothyroxine with simethicone. To prevent this interaction, simethicone is recommended to be taken at least 4 hours before or after levothyroxine.

== Pharmacology ==
Simethicone is a non-systemic surfactant which decreases the surface tension of gas bubbles in the GI tract. This allows gas bubbles to leave the GI tract as flatulence or belching. Simethicone does not reduce or prevent the formation of gas. Its effectiveness has been shown in several in vitro studies.

== Chemistry ==
Simethicone is a mixture of dimethicone and silicon dioxide.

== Names ==
The INN name is "simethicone", which was added to the INN recommended list in 1999.

Simethicone is marketed under many brand names and in many combination drugs; it is also marketed as a veterinary drug.

Brands

Brand names include A.F., Acid Off, Aero Red, Aero-OM, Aero-Sim, Aerocol, Aerox, Aesim, Aflat, Air-X, Anaflat, Antiflat, Baby Rest, Bicarsim, Bicarsim Forte, Blow-X, Bobotic, Bobotik, Carbogasol, Colic E, Colin, Cuplaton, Degas, Dentinox, Dermatix, Digesta, Dimetikon Meda, Disflatyl, Disolgas, Elugan N, Elzym, Endo-Paractol, Enterosilicona, Espaven Antigas, Espumisan, Espumisan L, Flacol, Flapex, Flatidyl, Flatoril, Flatulex, Flucolic, Gas X, Gas-X, Gaselab, Gaseoflat, Gaseoflatex, Gaseophar, Gaseoplus, Gaseovet, Gaservol, Gasimetin, Gasnil, Gasofilm, Gastrex, Gastrosen, Gazim X, Gazix, Geludrox-HS, Genasyme, Ilio-Funkton, Imogas, Imogaze, Imonogas, Infacalm, Infacol, Infacolic, Lefax, Lefaxin, Lefoam, Logastin, Luftal, Maxi Flat, Meteosim, Metiorisan, Metsil, Mylanta, Mylicon, Mylicongas, Mylom, Mymus, Nanog, Neodrop, Neogasol, Neolanta, Orocure, Ovol, Pedicon, Phazin, Phazyme, Polysilane Junior, Restime, Rugby Gas Relief, Sab Simplex, Salinal, Semecon, Semeth, Sicongast, Siflat, Silbione, Siligas, Silipin, Sim, Simcone, Simecon, Simecrin, Simedill, Simegut, Simet, Simethicon, Simethicone, Simetic, Simeticon, Simeticona, Simeticone, Siméticone, Simeticonum, Simetigast, Simflat, Simicol, Simicon, Wilcon, Wind-eze and WindSetlers.

It is also marketed as a combination drug:

- with algeldrate as Kestomatine
- with aluminium or magnesium salts and in some cases both, as Alamag Plus, Almacone, Alposim, Aluphagel, Alutop, Amico-L Andursil, Axcel Eviline, Boots Wind Relief, Di-Gel, Diovol Plus, Diovol Plus AF, Gas Ban DS, Hydrosil, Iosopan Plus, Kremil, Kremil-S, Maalox Plus, Magasida, Mi-Acid, Mygel, Mylagen, Mylanta, Polysilane, Polysilane Delalande, Rumibex and Trial AG
- with alverine as Avarin, Meteospasmyl, Nady-Spasmyl
- with barium sulfate as Bario Dif
- with bismuth as Gastop
- with calcium carbonate as Flamints, Gaseoflatex Plus, Malugel, Titralac Plus
- with activated charcoal as Carbosylane, Clingest, Finigax. Flatuna
- with cinitapride as Rogastril Plus
- with clebopride as Flatoril
- with dicycloverine as Cloact, Colicspam, Colimix, Colispas, Coliza-D, Cyclopam, Fri-Spas, Meftal Spas, Respas, Simcomine, Spasact, Spasmindon DPS
- with domperidone as Bigetric, Dom Simecon, Doprokin-S, Glomoti, Moperidona AF, Mutecium, Praxis
- with hydrotalcite as Altacide and Talsil Forte
- with homatropine as Aero-Sim Compuesto, Asestor, Factor AG, Sedotropina Flat
- with lactulose as Dinolak
- with levonorgestrel as Jaydess
- with loperamide as Eldoper Plus, Imodium Duo, Imolopesim, Loperamide HCl/Dimeticon, Loperuma, Lositala, Losiwuto, Regulane AF, Stoperan Plus, Toban F Plus
- with magaldrate as Aci Basic, Aci-Tip, Acicone-S, Acid-Farvet, Acifin, Amalset, Antiax, Asidrat, Assis, Avicid, Banacid-s, Buenox, Cremalon, Curecid, Digax, Digeril, Endcid, Gaseovet MS, Gastrine, Gastrogel, Gastroral, Gastrorapid, Magacid, Magal-D, Magalat, Magaldrato+Simeticona, Magaldrax, Maganta Plus, Magsilon, Marlox Plus, Megacil Plus, Megalrat Plus, Minicidez, Miopan Plus, Novelta, Oxecone-MS, Riopan Plus, Rolac Plus, Sedo Mag, Simagal, Simelgat Plus, Taimacon, Zymcon
- with metoclopramide as Anaflat Compuesto, Di-Aero OM, Digespar, Factorine, Pangastren
- with mosapride as M-Pride-MPS, Moxar, Moza MPS
- with pancreatin as Anaflat Enzimático, Digenil, Digesflat, Enzym Lefax, Enzymet, Enzymin, fermento duodenal, Finigax Indigestion, Flaton, Flazymec, Gasflat, Gaszym, Gesdyp, Hazmolin, Komflat, MeteoZym, Pankreoflat, Tripanzym
- with papaverine as Espasmo Siligas
- with pinaverium as Alevian Duo, Pladuet, Planex
- with pipenzolate bromide as Cadinol, Gasorbol Gotas
- with phloroglucinol as Meteoxane
- with trimebutine as Eumotil-S, Eumotrix Plus, Libertrim SDP, Libertrim SII, Muvett S
- with urea as Hidribet.

It is also marketed as a veterinary drug under the brands Birp and Methysilox.
