= Carbaldrate =

Chemical compound

Clinical data
- Trade names: Basaljel
- ATC code: A02AB04 (WHO)

Identifiers
- CAS Number: 41342-54-5
- ChemSpider: 32698025
- UNII: 6931E8LH07
- CompTox Dashboard (EPA): DTXSID301027585

Chemical and physical data
- Formula: (HO)_{2}Al(CO_{3})Na·nH_{2}O
- 3D model (JSmol): Interactive image
- SMILES: C(=O)([O-])[O-].O.[OH-].[OH-].[Na+].[Al+3]
- InChI: InChI=1S/CH2O3.Al.Na.3H2O/c2-1(3)4;;;;;/h(H2,2,3,4);;;3*1H2/q;+3;+1;;;/p-4; Key:YJTPLMXDQANDKS-UHFFFAOYSA-J

Carbaldrate (dihydroxyaluminum sodium carbonate) is an antacid.
