= Ebastine =

Antihistamine drug

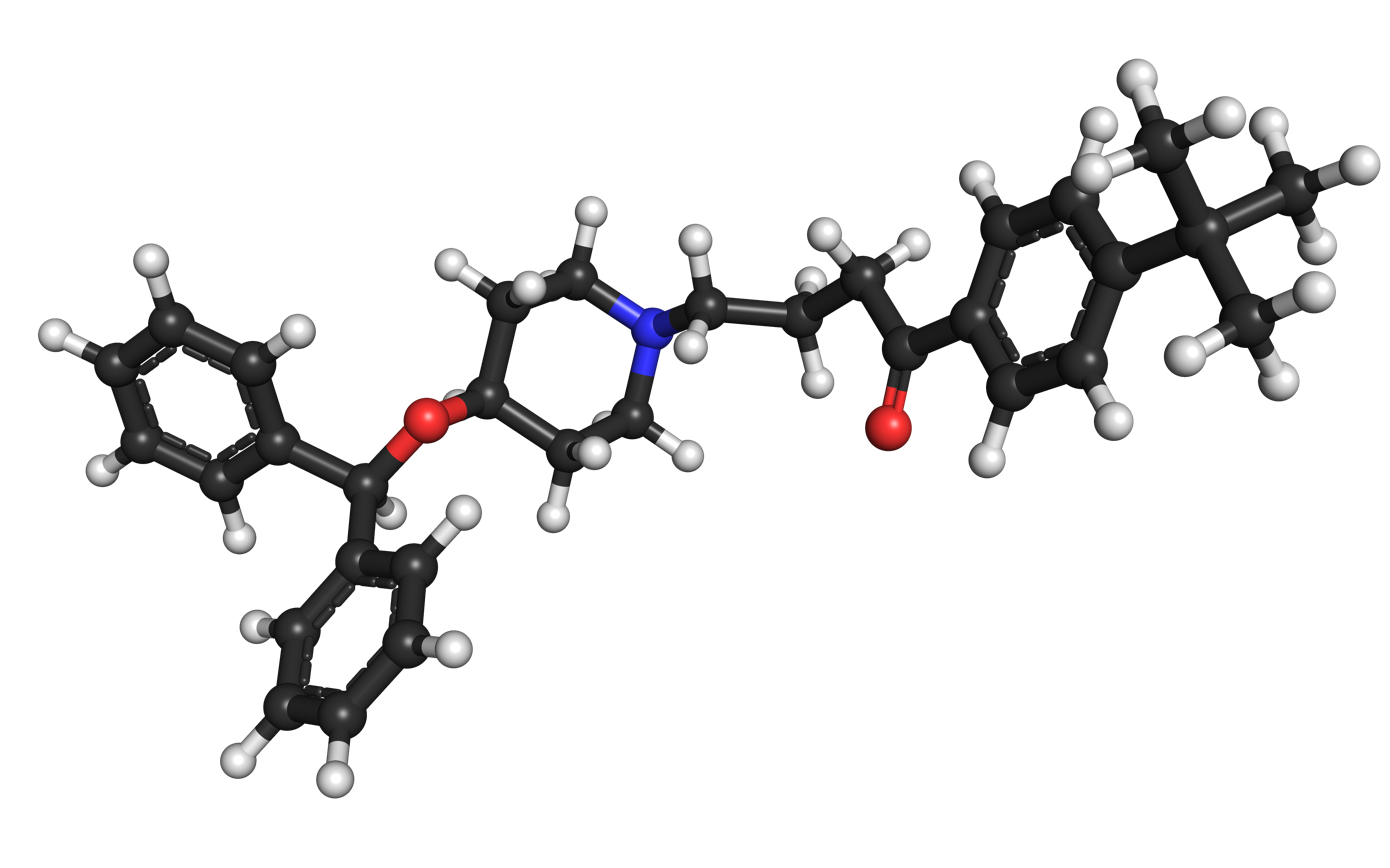
- Above: molecular structure of ebastine Below: 3D representation of an ebastine molecule

Clinical data
- AHFS/Drugs.com: International Drug Names
- Routes of administration: Oral
- ATC code: R06AX22 (WHO)

Pharmacokinetic data
- Protein binding: Greater than 95%
- Metabolism: Hepatic (CYP3A4-mediated), to carebastine
- Elimination half-life: 15 to 19 hours (carebastine)

Identifiers
- IUPAC name: 4-(4-benzhydryloxy-1-piperidyl)-1-(4-tert-butylphenyl)butan-1-one
- CAS Number: 90729-43-4
- PubChem CID: 3191
- ChemSpider: 3079
- UNII: TQD7Q784P1
- ChEMBL: ChEMBL305660
- CompTox Dashboard (EPA): DTXSID6046472
- ECHA InfoCard: 100.106.831

Chemical and physical data
- Formula: C_{32}H_{39}NO_{2}
- Molar mass: 469.669 g·mol^{−1}
- 3D model (JSmol): Interactive image
- SMILES: O=C(c1ccc(cc1)C(C)(C)C)CCCN4CCC(OC(c2ccccc2)c3ccccc3)CC4
- InChI: InChI=1S/C32H39NO2/c1-32(2,3)28-18-16-25(17-19-28)30(34)15-10-22-33-23-20-29(21-24-33)35-31(26-11-6-4-7-12-26)27-13-8-5-9-14-27/h4-9,11-14,16-19,29,31H,10,15,20-24H2,1-3H3; Key:MJJALKDDGIKVBE-UHFFFAOYSA-N

Ebastine is a H_{1} antihistamine with low potential for causing drowsiness.

It does not penetrate the blood–brain barrier to a significant amount and thus combines an effective block of the H_{1} receptor in peripheral tissue with a low incidence of central side effects, i.e. seldom causing sedation or drowsiness.

It was patented in 1983 by Almirall S.A and came into medical use in 1990. The substance is often provided in micronised form due to poor water solubility.

== Uses ==
Ebastine is a second-generation H1 receptor antagonist that is indicated mainly for allergic rhinitis and chronic idiopathic urticaria. It is available in 10 and 20 mg tablets and as fast-dissolving tablets, as well as in pediatric syrup. It has a recommended flexible daily dose of 10 or 20 mg, depending on disease severity.

Data from over 8,000 patients in more than 40 clinical trials and studies suggest efficacy of ebastine in the treatment of intermittent allergic rhinitis, persistent allergic rhinitis and other indications.

== Safety ==
Ebastine has shown overall safety and tolerability profile with no cognitive/psychomotor impairment and no sedation worse than placebo, and cardiac safety, that is, no QT prolongation. The incidence of most commonly reported adverse events was comparable between the ebastine and placebo groups, which confirms that ebastine has a favourable safety profile.

While experiments in pregnant animals showed no risk for the unborn, no such data are available in humans. It is not known whether ebastine passes into the breast milk.

== Pharmacokinetic profile ==
After oral administration, ebastine undergoes extensive first-pass metabolism by hepatic cytochrome P450 3A4 into its active carboxylic acid metabolite, carebastine. This conversion is practically complete.

Carebastine, the active metabolite

== Brand names ==
Ebastine is available in different formulations (tablets, fast dissolving tablets and syrup) and commercialized under different brand names around the world, Ebast, Ebatin, Ebatin Fast, Ebatrol, Atmos, Ebet, Ebastel FLAS, Kestine, KestineLIO, KestinLYO, EstivanLYO, Evastel Z, Eteen (EURO Pharma Ltd.), Tebast (SQUARE), Ebasten (ACI), etc.

== See also ==
- Desloratadine
