= Teprenone =

Chemical compound

Clinical data
- Trade names: Selbex
- Other names: Geranylgeranylacetone; Tetraprenylacetone
- AHFS/Drugs.com: International Drug Names
- ATC code: A02BX15 (WHO) QA02BX15 (WHO)

Legal status
- Legal status: In general: ℞ (Prescription only)

Identifiers
- IUPAC name: (5E,9E,13E)-6,10,14,18-tetramethylnonadeca-5,9,13,17-tetraen-2-one
- CAS Number: 6809-52-5
- PubChem CID: 5282199
- DrugBank: DB15955
- ChemSpider: 29787024
- UNII: S8S8451A4O
- KEGG: D01827
- ChEBI: CHEBI:31649
- ChEMBL: ChEMBL79686
- CompTox Dashboard (EPA): DTXSID901166719

Chemical and physical data
- Formula: C_{23}H_{38}O
- Molar mass: 330.556 g·mol^{−1}
- 3D model (JSmol): Interactive image
- SMILES: CC(C)=CCC\C(C)=C\CC\C(C)=C\CC\C(C)=C\CCC(C)=O
- InChI: InChI=1S/C23H38O/c1-19(2)11-7-12-20(3)13-8-14-21(4)15-9-16-22(5)17-10-18-23(6)24/h11,13,15,17H,7-10,12,14,16,18H2,1-6H3/b20-13+,21-15+,22-17+; Key:HUCXKZBETONXFO-NJFMWZAGSA-N

Teprenone (or geranylgeranylacetone; sold under the brand name Selbex) is a medication used for the treatment of gastric ulcers.
