= Sulglicotide =

Chemical compound

Clinical data
- AHFS/Drugs.com: International Drug Names
- ATC code: A02BX08 (WHO)

Identifiers
- CAS Number: 54182-59-1
- ChemSpider: none
- UNII: 26473073GC
- KEGG: D08546

Sulglicotide (or sulglycotide) is a drug used for peptic ulcer and gastro-oesophageal reflux disease.
