= Gefarnate =

Chemical compound

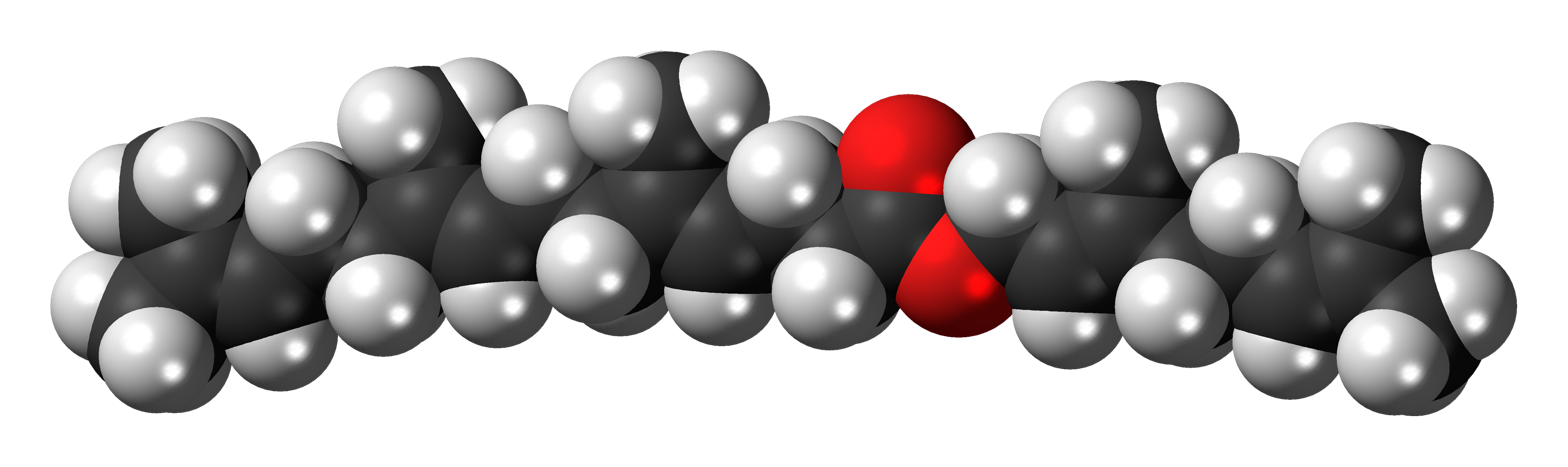

Clinical data
- AHFS/Drugs.com: International Drug Names
- ATC code: A02BX07 (WHO)

Identifiers
- IUPAC name: (2E)-3,7-dimethylocta-2,6-dien-1-yl (4E,8E)-5,9,13-trimethyltetradeca-4,8,12-trienoate
- CAS Number: 51-77-4
- PubChem CID: 5282182
- ChemSpider: 4445377
- UNII: 1ISE2Y6ULA
- KEGG: D01529
- ChEMBL: ChEMBL2105085
- CompTox Dashboard (EPA): DTXSID0048636
- ECHA InfoCard: 100.000.111

Chemical and physical data
- Formula: C_{27}H_{44}O_{2}
- Molar mass: 400.647 g·mol^{−1}
- 3D model (JSmol): Interactive image
- SMILES: CC(C)=CCC/C(C)=C/CC/C(C)=C/CCC(=O)OC/C=C(C)/CCC=C(C)C
- InChI: InChI=1S/C27H44O2/c1-22(2)12-8-14-24(5)16-10-17-25(6)18-11-19-27(28)29-21-20-26(7)15-9-13-23(3)4/h12-13,16,18,20H,8-11,14-15,17,19,21H2,1-7H3/b24-16+,25-18+,26-20+; Key:ZPACYDRSPFRDHO-ROBAGEODSA-N

Gefarnate is a drug used for the treatment of gastric ulcers.

It also has been proposed for use in the treatment of dry eye syndrome.
