= Vonoprazan/amoxicillin/clarithromycin =

Medication

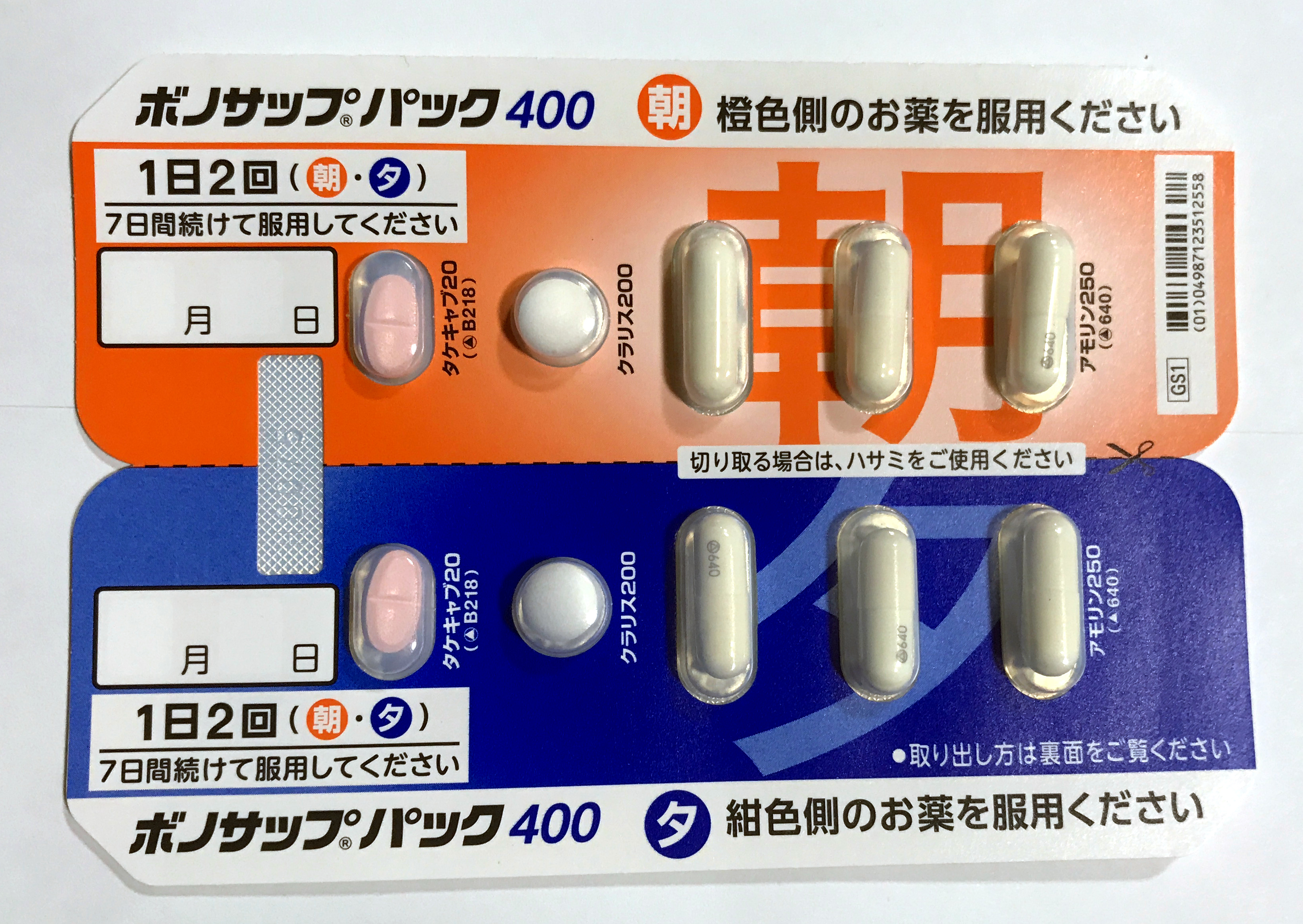

Combination of
- Vonoprazan: Potassium-competitive acid blocker
- Amoxicillin: Beta-lactam antibiotic
- Clarithromycin: Macrolide antibiotic

Clinical data
- Trade names: Vonosap, Voquezna Triple Pak
- License data: US DailyMed: Voquezna
- ATC code: A02BD14 (WHO)

Legal status
- Legal status: US: ℞-only; Rx-only

Identifiers
- KEGG: D10775

Vonoprazan/amoxicillin/clarithromycin, sold under the brand name Vonosap among others, is a co-packaged medication used for the treatment of Helicobacter pylori (H. pylori) infection. It contains vonoprazan (as the fumarate), a potassium-competitive acid blocker; amoxicillin, a beta-lactam antibiotic; and clarithromycin, a macrolide antibiotic.

It was approved for medical use in Japan in 2016, and in the United States in May 2022. The US Food and Drug Administration (FDA) considers it to be a first-in-class medication.
