= Soquinolol =

Names
- IUPAC name 5-[3-(tert-Butylamino)-2-hydroxypropoxy]-3,4-dihydro-1H-isoquinoline-2-carbaldehyde

Identifiers
CAS Number	61563-18-6
3D model (JSmol)	Interactive image; Interactive image
ChemSpider	62047
ECHA InfoCard	100.057.113
PubChem CID	68811
UNII	15CC9BOH7Q
CompTox Dashboard (EPA)	DTXSID00866865
- InChI: InChI=1S/C17H26N2O3/c1-17(2,3)18-9-14(21)11-22-16-6-4-5-13-10-19(12-20)8-7-15(13)16/h4-6,12,14,18,21H,7-11H2,1-3H3 Key: GMJHUSJLZXFFQJ-UHFFFAOYSA-N; InChI=1/C17H26N2O3/c1-17(2,3)18-9-14(21)11-22-16-6-4-5-13-10-19(12-20)8-7-15(13)16/h4-6,12,14,18,21H,7-11H2,1-3H3 Key: GMJHUSJLZXFFQJ-UHFFFAOYAM
- SMILES: CC(C)(C)NCC(COC1=CC=CC2=C1CCN(C2)C=O)O; CC(C)(C)NCC(COc1cccc2c1CCN(C2)C=O)O

Properties
Chemical formula	C_{17}H_{26}N_{2}O_{3}
Molar mass	306.406 g·mol^{−1}
- Except where otherwise noted, data are given for materials in their standard state (at 25 °C [77 °F], 100 kPa). Infobox references

Soquinolol is a beta adrenergic receptor antagonist.
