= Irsogladine =

Names
- Preferred IUPAC name 6-(2,5-Dichlorophenyl)1,3,5-triazine-2,4-diamine
- Other names DCPDAT, Dicloguamine, MN-1695.

Identifiers
| CAS Number | 57381-26-7 |
| 3D model (JSmol) | Interactive image |
| ChEBI | CHEBI:93307 |
| ChEMBL | ChEMBL136497 |
| ChemSpider | 3621 |
| DrugBank | DB13056 |
| KEGG | D08087 |
| PubChem CID | 3752 |
| UNII | QBX79NZC1D |
| CompTox Dashboard (EPA) | DTXSID8043999 |
- InChI: InChI=1S/C9H7Cl2N5/c10-4-1-2-6(11)5(3-4)7-14-8(12)16-9(13)15-7/h1-3H,(H4,12,13,14,15,16) Key: ATCGGEJZONJOCL-UHFFFAOYSA-N
- SMILES: C1=CC(=C(C=C1Cl)C2=NC(=NC(=N2)N)N)Cl

Properties
| Chemical formula | C_{9}H_{7}Cl_{2}N_{5} |
| Molar mass | 256.09 g·mol^{−1} |

Pharmacology
| ATC code | A02BX16 (WHO) |
- Except where otherwise noted, data are given for materials in their standard state (at 25 °C [77 °F], 100 kPa). Infobox references

Irsogladine is a phosphodiesterase inhibitor.

== Synthesis ==
ChemDrug Synthesis: Patent:

2,4-Dichloro-6-(2,5-dichlorophenyl)-1,3,5-triazine [61479-79-6] (1) (2) Dicyandiamide [461-58-5] (3) 2,5-Dichlorobenzonitrile [21663-61-6] (4)
