= Roxatidine acetate =

Chemical compound

Clinical data
- Routes of administration: Oral
- ATC code: A02BA06 (WHO)

Pharmacokinetic data
- Bioavailability: 80–90%
- Protein binding: 5–7%
- Metabolism: Hepatic deacetylation Minor involvement of CYP2D6 and CYP2A6
- Elimination half-life: 5–7 hours
- Excretion: Renal

Identifiers
- IUPAC name: 2-oxo-2-(3-[3-(piperidin-1-ylmethyl)phenoxy]propylamino)ethyl acetate
- CAS Number: 78628-28-1; roxatidine: 78273-80-0
- PubChem CID: 5105
- DrugBank: DB08806
- ChemSpider: 4926
- UNII: ZUP3LSD0DO; roxatidine: IV9VHT3YUM
- KEGG: D08495
- ChEMBL: ChEMBL46102
- CompTox Dashboard (EPA): DTXSID2048325

Chemical and physical data
- Formula: C_{19}H_{28}N_{2}O_{4}
- Molar mass: 348.443 g·mol^{−1}
- 3D model (JSmol): Interactive image
- SMILES: O=C(C)OCC(=O)NCCCOc1cccc(c1)CN2CCCCC2
- InChI: InChI=1S/C19H28N2O4/c1-16(22)25-15-19(23)20-9-6-12-24-18-8-5-7-17(13-18)14-21-10-3-2-4-11-21/h5,7-8,13H,2-4,6,9-12,14-15H2,1H3,(H,20,23); Key:SMTZFNFIKUPEJC-UHFFFAOYSA-N

Roxatidine acetate is a specific and competitive histamine H_{2} receptor antagonist drug that is used to treat gastric ulcers, Zollinger–Ellison syndrome, erosive esophagitis, gastro-oesophageal reflux disease, and gastritis.

Pharmacodynamic studies showed that 150 mg of roxatidine acetate were optimal in suppressing gastric acid secretion, and that a single bedtime dose of 150 mg was more effective than a dose of 75 mg twice daily in terms of inhibiting nocturnal acid secretion.

It was patented in 1979 and approved for medical use in 1986. It is available in countries including China, Japan, Korea, Germany, Italy, the Netherlands, Greece, and South Africa.

== Synthesis ==
ThiemeChemDrug Synthesis: Patent: Sino revised protocols:

The reductive amination between piperidine (1) and 3-hydroxybenzaldehyde (2) gives 3-(1-piperidinylmethyl)phenol (3). Williamson ether synthesis with N-(3-bromopropyl)phthalimide (4) gives the intermediate 5. Deprotection with hydrazine yields (3-(1-piperidinylmethyl)phenoxy)propylamine (6). Heating with glycolic acid (7) provides roxatidine (8) which is then converted to its acetate ester, roxatidine acetate (9), by acetylation with acetic anhydride.
