= Niperotidine =

Names
- Preferred IUPAC name (Z)-N^{1}-[(2H-1,3-Benzodioxol-5-yl)methyl]-N′^{1}-{2-[({5-[(dimethylamino)methyl]furan-2-yl}methyl)sulfanyl]ethyl}-2-nitroethene-1,1-diamine

Identifiers
CAS Number	84845-75-0
3D model (JSmol)	Interactive image
ChEMBL	ChEMBL1909284
ChemSpider	11644617
ECHA InfoCard	100.076.612
EC Number	284-304-0
KEGG	D07072
MeSH	C073716
PubChem CID	3033952
UNII	12JBD7U72K
- InChI: InChI=1S/C20H28N4O5S/c1-23(2)11-16-4-5-17(29-16)13-30-8-7-21-20(12-24(25)26)22-10-15-3-6-18-19(9-15)28-14-27-18/h3-6,9,20-22H,7-8,10-14H2,1-2H3 Key: VZPXHGJTEAPNAA-UHFFFAOYSA-N; InChI=1/C20H28N4O5S/c1-23(2)11-16-4-5-17(29-16)13-30-8-7-21-20(12-24(25)26)22-10-15-3-6-18-19(9-15)28-14-27-18/h3-6,9,20-22H,7-8,10-14H2,1-2H3 Key: VZPXHGJTEAPNAA-UHFFFAOYAQ
- SMILES: CN(C)Cc1ccc(o1)CSCCN/C(=C\[N+](=O)[O-])NCc2cc3OCOc3cc2

Properties
Chemical formula	C_{20}H_{26}N_{4}O_{5}S
Molar mass	434.51 g·mol^{−1}

Pharmacology
ATC code	A02BA05 (WHO)
- Except where otherwise noted, data are given for materials in their standard state (at 25 °C [77 °F], 100 kPa). verify (what is ?) Infobox references

Niperotidine is a histamine antagonist selective for the H_{2} subtype. It was studied as a treatment for excessive gastric acidity, but withdrawn after human trials showed liver damage.
