= Antiflatulent =

Drug used to prevent flatulence

An antiflatulent or deflatulent is a drug used for the alleviation or prevention of flatulence, excessive intestinal gas.

== Mechanisms of action ==
=== Preventing gas ===
- Enzymes – Enzyme-based dietary supplements break down indigestible substances and prevent these substances from reaching the large intestine intact – where anaerobic bacteria produce gas. Substances indigestible by humans are usually present in foods associated with flatulence, like beans. When these substances reach the large intestine intact, they may be fermented by intestinal bacteria, thereby causing gas production. These supplements are usually taken with foods associated with flatulence. It is important to take the appropriate enzyme with the appropriate food. When consuming beans and other vegetables high in complex carbohydrates, it may be helpful to take a product that contains alpha-galactosidase, such as Beano or kombu. Additionally, for individuals with lactose intolerance, taking a lactase-containing product with lactose-containing foodstuffs may reduce flatulence.
- Herbal inhibitors – Many herbal substances have been observed since antiquity for reducing flatulence, particularly gas from eating legumes. Cloves, nutmeg, cinnamon, and garlic are potent in reducing gas. The potency of garlic increases when heated, whereas the potency of cinnamon decreases. Other spices have a lesser effect in reducing gas, including turmeric, black pepper, asafoetida and ginger. Other common Indian spices, aniseed, ajowan, and cardamom do not inhibit gas production, in fact they exacerbate it significantly. In contrast, cumin has been shown to reduce bloating and alleviate other gastrointestinal ailments.

=== Relieving gas ===
For the alleviation of flatulence, an antifoaming agent such as simethicone may be taken orally. This agent will coalesce the smaller gas bubbles into larger bubbles, thereby easing the release of gas within the gastrointestinal tract via burping or flatulence.

== Classification ==
=== Antifoaming agents ===
- Simethicone (also marketed under the name "Gas-X" in some countries)

=== Enzyme-based dietary supplements ===
- Beano
- Lactase (brand Lactaid)

=== Herbal antiflatulents ===
- Epazote is claimed to have antiflatulent properties.
- Asafoetida reduces the growth of indigenous microflora in the gut thereby reducing flatulence.

== See also ==
- Carminative
