= Omeprazole =

Medication to treat gastroesophageal reflux disease and other conditions

Clinical data
- Pronunciation: /oʊˈmɛprəzoʊl/
- Trade names: Losec, Prilosec, others
- AHFS/Drugs.com: Monograph
- MedlinePlus: a693050
- License data: US DailyMed: Omeprazole
- Pregnancy category: AU: B3
- Routes of administration: By mouth, intravenous
- Drug class: Proton-pump inhibitor
- ATC code: A02BC01 (WHO) A02BC51 (WHO)

Legal status
- Legal status: AU: S4 (Prescription only); CA: ℞-only; UK: POM (Prescription only); US: OTC / Rx-only; EU: Rx-only

Pharmacokinetic data
- Bioavailability: 35–76%
- Protein binding: 95%
- Metabolism: Liver (CYP2C19, CYP3A4)
- Elimination half-life: 1–1.2 hours
- Excretion: 80% (urine); 20% (bile via feces)

Identifiers
- IUPAC name: 5-Methoxy-2-[(4-methoxy-3,5-dimethylpyridin-2-yl)methanesulfinyl]-1H-benzimidazole
- CAS Number: 73590-58-6
- PubChem CID: 4594
- IUPHAR/BPS: 4279
- DrugBank: DB00338
- ChemSpider: 4433
- UNII: KG60484QX9
- KEGG: D00455
- ChEBI: CHEBI:7772
- ChEMBL: ChEMBL1503
- PDB ligand: 1C6 (PDBe, RCSB PDB)
- CompTox Dashboard (EPA): DTXSID6021080
- ECHA InfoCard: 100.122.967

Chemical and physical data
- Formula: C_{17}H_{19}N_{3}O_{3}S
- Molar mass: 345.42 g·mol^{−1}
- 3D model (JSmol): Interactive image
- Chirality: Racemic mixture
- Density: 1.4±0.1 g/cm^{3}
- Melting point: 156 °C (313 °F)
- SMILES: CC1=CN=C(C(=C1OC)C)CS(=O)C2=NC3=C(N2)C=C(C=C3)OC
- InChI: InChI=1S/C17H19N3O3S/c1-10-8-18-15(11(2)16(10)23-4)9-24(21)17-19-13-6-5-12(22-3)7-14(13)20-17/h5-8H,9H2,1-4H3,(H,19,20); Key:SUBDBMMJDZJVOS-UHFFFAOYSA-N

Omeprazole, sold under the brand names Prilosec and Losec among others, is a medication used in the treatment of gastroesophageal reflux disease (GERD), peptic ulcer disease, and Zollinger–Ellison syndrome. It is also used to prevent upper gastrointestinal bleeding in people who are at high risk. Omeprazole is a proton-pump inhibitor (PPI) and its effectiveness is similar to that of other PPIs. It can be taken by mouth or by injection into a vein. It is also available in the fixed-dose combination medication omeprazole/sodium bicarbonate as Zegerid and as Konvomep.

Common side effects include nausea, vomiting, headaches, abdominal pain, and increased intestinal gas. Serious side effects may include Clostridioides difficile colitis, an increased risk of pneumonia, an increased risk of bone fractures, and the potential of masking stomach cancer. Whether it is safe for use in pregnancy is unclear. It works by blocking the release of stomach acid.

Omeprazole was patented in 1978 and approved for medical use in 1988. It is on the World Health Organization's List of Essential Medicines. It is available as a generic medication. In 2024, it was the tenth most commonly prescribed medication in the United States, with more than 49 million prescriptions. It is also available without a prescription in the United States.

== Medical uses ==
Omeprazole can be used in the treatment of gastroesophageal reflux disease (GERD), heartburn, peptic ulcers, erosive esophagitis, Zollinger–Ellison syndrome, and eosinophilic esophagitis.

=== Peptic ulcers ===
Peptic ulcers may be treated with omeprazole. Infection with Helicobacter pylori can be treated by taking omeprazole, amoxicillin, and clarithromycin together for 7–14 days. Amoxicillin may be replaced with metronidazole in patients who are allergic to penicillin.

== Adverse effects ==
Adverse effects occurring in at least 1% of people include:

- Central nervous system: headache (7%), dizziness (2%)
- Respiratory: upper respiratory tract infection (2%), cough (1%)
- Gastrointestinal: abdominal pain (5%), diarrhea (4%), nausea (4%), vomiting (3%), flatulence (3%), acid regurgitation (2%), constipation (2%)
- Neuromuscular and skeletal: back pain (1%), weakness (1%)
- Dermatologic: rash (2%)

Other concerns related to adverse effects are:

- Recurrence of Clostridioides difficile associated diarrhea
- Osteoporosis-related fractures
- Hypomagnesemia

Concern has been expressed regarding vitamin B_{12} and iron malabsorption, but effects seem to be insignificant, especially when supplement therapy is provided.

Since their introduction, proton-pump inhibitors (PPIs, especially omeprazole) have also been associated with several cases of acute interstitial nephritis, an inflammation of the kidneys that often occurs as an adverse drug reaction.

=== Long-term use ===
Long-term use of PPIs is strongly associated with the development of benign polyps from fundic glands (which is distinct from fundic gland polyposis); these polyps do not cause cancer and resolve when PPIs are discontinued. No association is seen between PPI use and cancer, but use of PPIs may mask gastric cancers or other serious gastric problems.

There is a possible association between long-term use and dementia which requires further study to confirm.

An article published in 2013 claims that the long-term use of PPIs is associated with decreased calcium absorption (causing increased risk of osteoporosis and fractures), decreased magnesium absorption (causing electrolyte disturbances), and increased risk of certain infections, such as C. difficile and community-acquired pneumonia. The authors hypothesize that this is due to decreased stomach acid production.

=== Pregnancy and breastfeeding ===
The safety of using omeprazole has not been established in pregnant or breastfeeding women. Epidemiological data do not show an increased risk of major birth defects after maternal use of omeprazole during pregnancy.

== Interactions ==
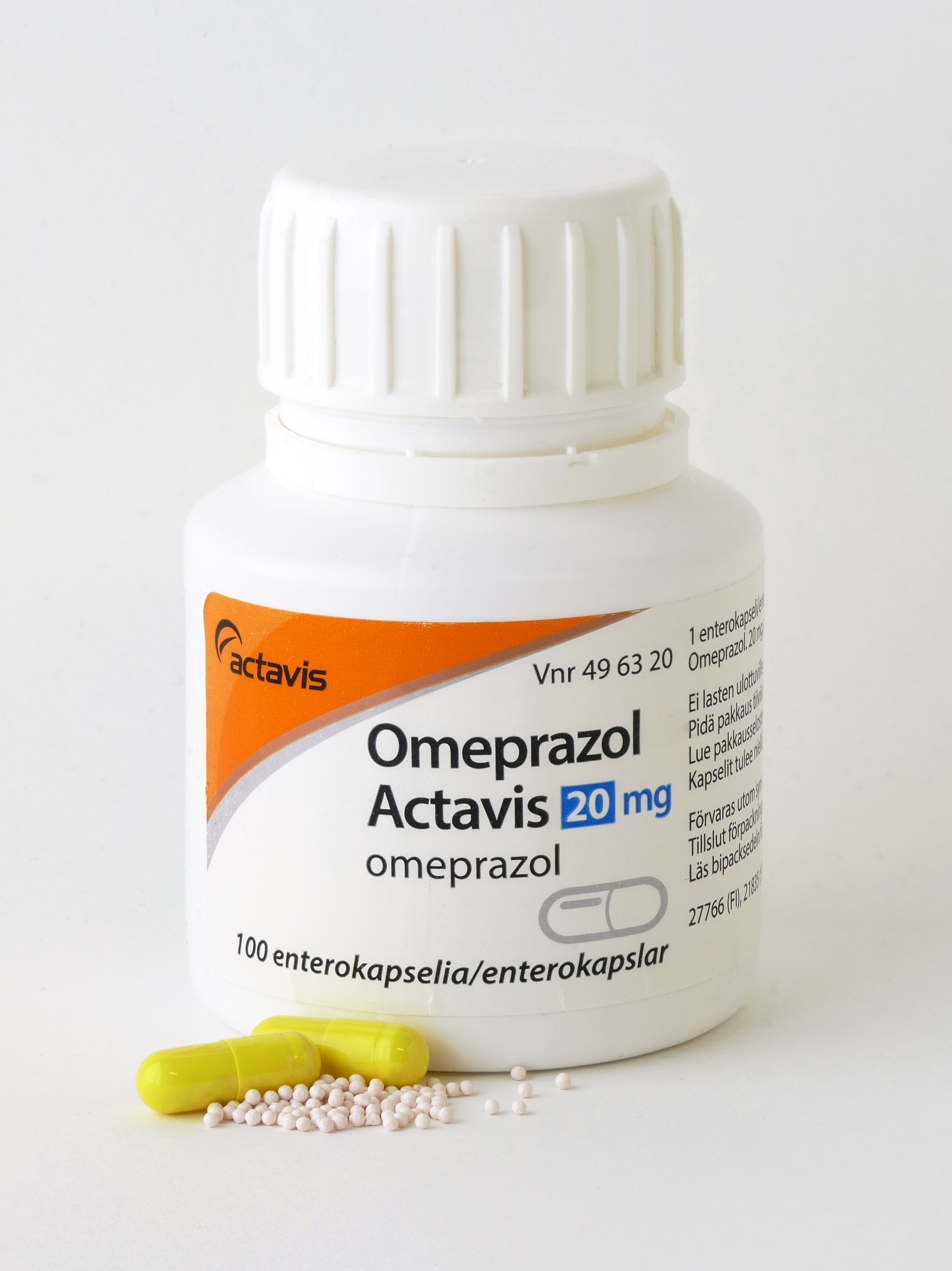
Omeprazol Actavis 20 mg, bottle and pills in Sweden

Important drug interactions are rare. However, the most significant major drug interaction concern is the decreased activation of clopidogrel when taken together with omeprazole. Although still controversial, this may increase the risk of stroke or heart attack in people taking clopidogrel to prevent these events.

This interaction is possible because omeprazole is an inhibitor of the enzymes CYP2C19 and CYP3A4. Clopidogrel is an inactive prodrug that partially depends on CYP2C19 for conversion to its active form. Inhibition of CYP2C19 may block the activation of clopidogrel, which could reduce its effects.

Almost all benzodiazepines are metabolised by the CYP3A4 and CYP2D6 pathways, and inhibition of these enzymes results in a higher area under the curve (i.e., the total effect over time of a given dose). Other examples of drugs dependent on CYP3A4 for their metabolism are escitalopram, warfarin, oxycodone, tramadol, and oxymorphone. The concentrations of these drugs may increase if they are used concomitantly with omeprazole.

Omeprazole is also a competitive inhibitor of p-glycoprotein, as are other PPIs.

Drugs that depend on an acidic stomach environment (such as ketoconazole or atazanavir) may be poorly absorbed, whereas acid-labile antibiotics (such as erythromycin which is a very strong CYP3A4 inhibitor) may be absorbed to a greater extent than normal due to the more alkaline environment of the stomach.

St. John's wort (Hypericum perforatum) and Ginkgo biloba significantly reduce plasma concentrations of omeprazole through induction of CYP3A4 and CYP2C19.

== Pharmacology ==
Omeprazole irreversibly blocks the enzyme system on parietal cells that is needed for the secretion of gastric acid. It is a specific H^{+}/K^{+}ATPase inhibitor. This is the enzyme needed for the final step in the secretion of gastric acid.

=== Pharmacokinetics ===
The absorption of omeprazole takes place in the small intestine and is usually completed within three to six hours. The systemic bioavailability of omeprazole after repeated doses is about 60%. Omeprazole has a volume of distribution of 0.4 L/kg. It has high plasma protein binding of 95%.

Omeprazole is completely metabolized by the cytochrome P450 system, mainly in the liver, by CYP2C19 and CYP3A4 isoenzymes. Identified metabolites are the sulfone, the sulfide, and hydroxy-omeprazole. About 77% of an orally given dose is excreted as metabolites in the urine, and the remainder is found in the feces, primarily originating from bile secretion. Omeprazole has a half life of 0.5 to 1 hour.

==== Bioactivation ====
As with all structurally-similar benzimidazole proton pump inhibitors, omeprazole is a prodrug. A basic molecule, it accumulates in the acidic canaliculi of parietal cells in a protonated form where the S=O group becomes S-OH, which in turn is interconvertible with an achiral, reactive sulfenamide form. The sulfenamide form is able to attach onto the cysteine residue on the H^{+}/K^{+}-ATPase, thereby irreversibly inhibiting it.

==== Chirality ====
The two different chiralities of omeprazole are both metabolized into inactive products by cytochrome P450 enzymes, but each chirality is differently inactivated by specific isozymes. Compared to the (R)-enantiomer, the (S)-enantiomer is relatively more resistant to metabolism, especially metabolism by CYP2C19 (if it's processed by CYP2C19 at all). As a result, among people with a more active version of CYP2C19 ("extensive metabolizers"), the (R) half of a dose of omeprazole is likely to perform more poorly. Conversely, among those with a less active version of CYP2C19 ("poor metabolizers"), more the (R) half is expected to survive metabolism and end up useful. The proportion of the poor metabolizer phenotype varies widely between populations, from 2.0 to 2.5% in African Americans and white Americans to >20% in Asians. Several pharmacogenomics studies have suggested that PPI treatment should be tailored according to CYP2C19 metabolism status.

AstraZeneca also developed esomeprazole (Nexium) which is a eutomer, purely the (S)-enantiomer, rather than a racemate like omeprazole.

=== Mechanism of action ===
Omeprazole is a selective and irreversible proton pump inhibitor. It suppresses stomach acid secretion by specific inhibition of the H^{+}/K^{+}-ATPase system found at the secretory surface of gastric parietal cells. Because this enzyme system is regarded as the acid (proton, or H^{+}) pump within the gastric mucosa, omeprazole inhibits the final step of acid production.

Omeprazole also inhibits both basal and stimulated acid secretion irrespective of the stimulus as it blocks the last step in acid secretion. The drug binds non-competitively so it has a dose-dependent effect.

The inhibitory effect of omeprazole occurs within one hour after oral administration. The maximum effect occurs within two hours. The duration of inhibition is up to 72 hours. When omeprazole is stopped, baseline stomach acid secretory activity returns after three to five days. The inhibitory effect of omeprazole on acid secretion will plateau after four days of repeated daily dosing.

Omeprazole is only effective on active H^{+}/K^{+}-ATPase pumps. These pumps are stimulated in the presence of food to aid in digestion.

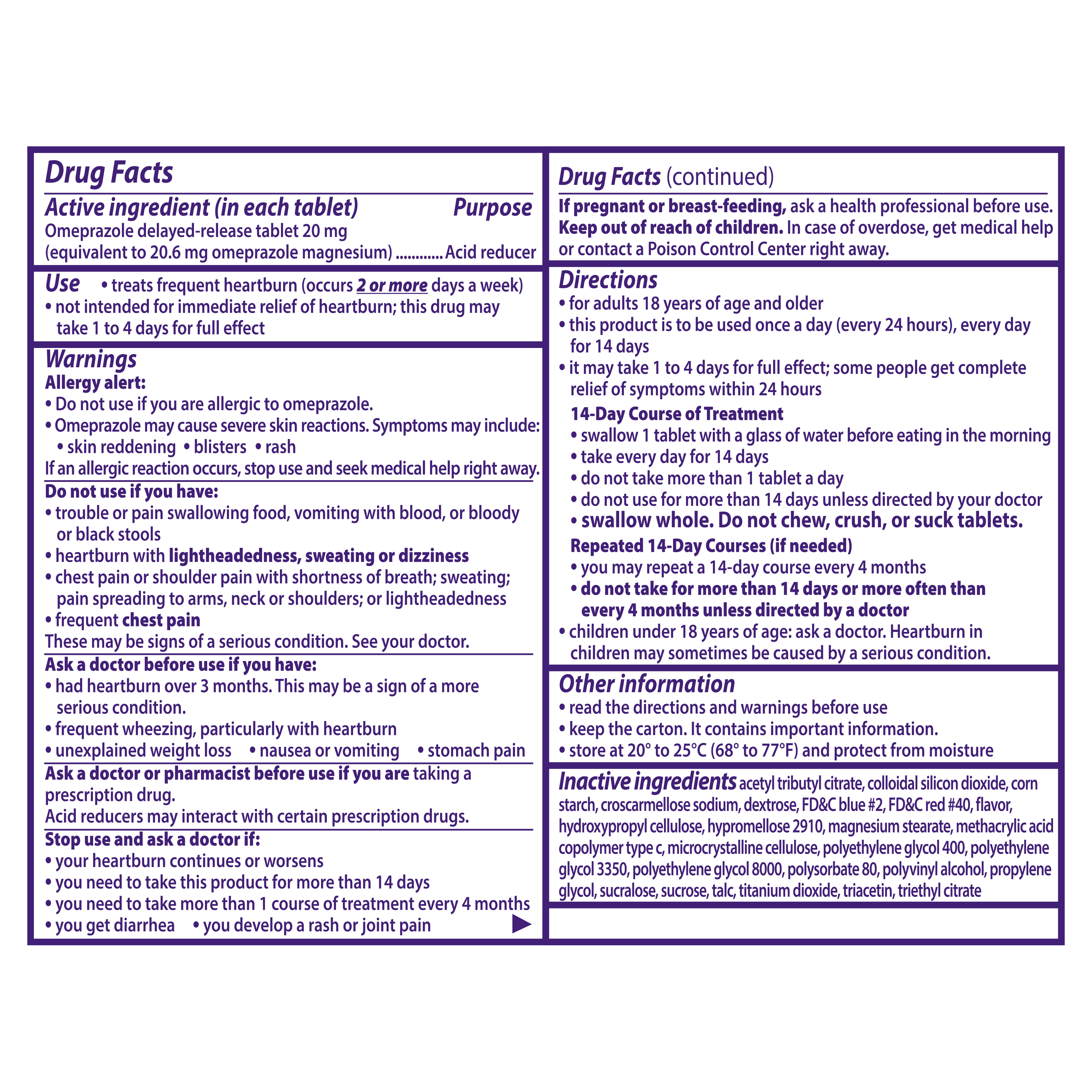

== Chemistry ==
Omeprazole contains a tricoordinated sulfinyl sulfur in a pyramidal structure and therefore can exist as either the (S)- or (R)-enantiomers. Omeprazole is a racemate, an equal mixture of the two.

=== Measurement in body fluids ===
Omeprazole may be quantified in plasma or serum to monitor therapy or to confirm a diagnosis of poisoning in hospitalized patients. Plasma omeprazole concentrations are usually in a range of 0.2–1.2 mg/L in persons receiving the drug therapeutically by the oral route and 1–6 mg/L in people with acute overdose. Enantiomeric chromatographic methods are available to distinguish esomeprazole from racemic omeprazole.

== History ==
Omeprazole was first made in 1979 by Swedish AB Hässle, part of Astra AB. It was the first of the proton pump inhibitors (PPI). Astra AB, now AstraZeneca, launched it as an ulcer medicine under the name Losec in Sweden. It was first sold in the United States in 1989 under the brand name Losec. In 1990, at the request of the US Food and Drug Administration, the brand name Losec was changed to Prilosec to avoid confusion with the diuretic Lasix (furosemide). The new name led to confusion between omeprazole (Prilosec) and fluoxetine (Prozac), an antidepressant. Prilosec is owned by Procter & Gamble in alliance with AstraZeneca and the product is designed to address frequent heartburn, which can be triggered by various factors such as certain foods, stress, and smoking.

Prilosec was first introduced in 1989 as a prescription medication approved by the FDA for the treatment of severe heartburn. In 2003, Prilosec OTC was launched as the first over-the-counter option for managing frequent heartburn. It is known for its advertising campaign featuring Larry the Cable Guy as the spokesperson for the brand, during the 2010s, emphasizing the concept of "Zero Heartburn".

== Society and culture ==
=== Economics ===
When Prilosec's US patent expired in April 2001, AstraZeneca introduced esomeprazole (Nexium) as a patented replacement drug. Many companies introduced generics as AstraZeneca's patents expired worldwide, which are available under many brand names.

Omeprazole was a subject of a patent litigation in the U.S. The invention involved application of two different coatings to a drug in pill form to ensure that the omeprazole did not disintegrate before reaching its intended site of action in the stomach. Although the solution by means of two coatings was obvious, the patent was found valid, because the source of the problem was non-obvious and was discovered by the patentee.

In September 2023, AstraZeneca announced it would pay $425 million to settle product liability litigations against Prilosec in the United States.

=== Brand names ===
Brand names include Losec, Prilosec, Zegerid, Miracid, and Omez.

== Veterinary uses ==
In February 2025, the Committee for Veterinary Medicinal Products of the European Medicines Agency adopted a positive opinion, recommending the granting of a marketing authorization for the veterinary medicinal product Omeprazole TriviumVet, gastro-resistant capsule, hard, intended for dogs. The applicant for this veterinary medicinal product is TriviumVet DAC. Omeprazole TriviumVet was authorized for veterinary use in the European Union in April 2025.
