= Antacid =

Substance that relieves stomach problems

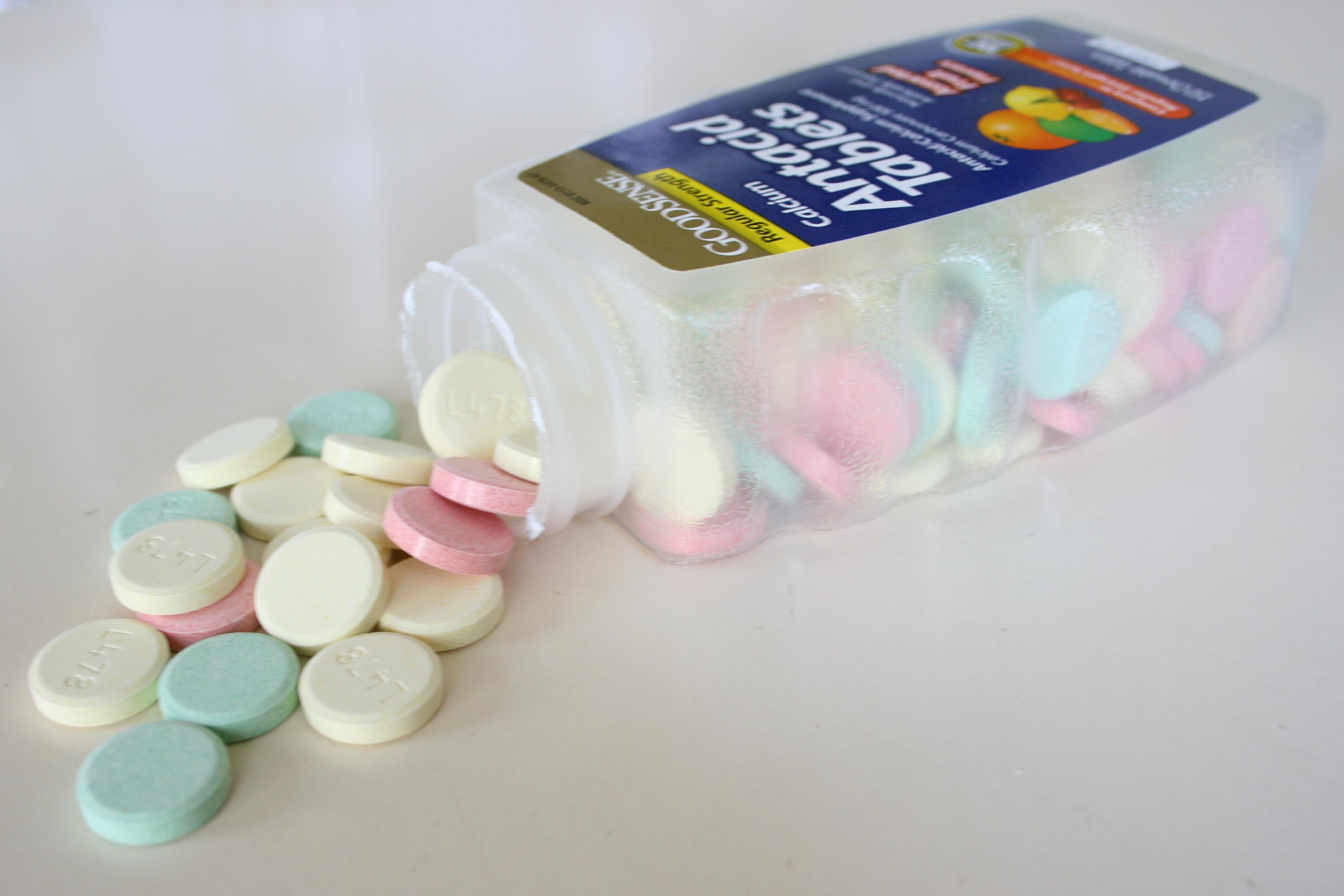
Calcium carbonate antacid tablets

An antacid is a substance which neutralizes stomach acidity and is used to relieve heartburn, indigestion, or an upset stomach. Some antacids have been used in the treatment of constipation and diarrhea. Marketed antacids contain salts of aluminium, calcium, magnesium, or sodium. Some preparations contain a combination of two salts, such as magnesium carbonate and aluminium hydroxide (e.g., hydrotalcite).

== Medical uses ==
Antacids are available over the counter and are taken by mouth to quickly relieve occasional heartburn, the major symptom of gastroesophageal reflux disease and indigestion. Treatment with antacids alone is symptomatic and only justified for minor symptoms. Alternative uses for antacids include constipation, diarrhea, hyperphosphatemia, and urinary alkalization. Some antacids are also used as an adjunct to pancreatic enzyme replacement therapy in the treatment of pancreatic insufficiency.

Non-particulate antacids (sodium citrate) increase gastric pH with little or no effect on gastric volume, and therefore may see some limited use in pre-operative procedures. Sodium citrate should be given within one hour of surgery to be the most effect.

== Side effects ==
Conventional effervescent tablets contain a significant amount of sodium and are associated with increased risk of adverse cardiovascular events according to a 2013 study. Alternative sodium-free formulations containing magnesium salts may cause diarrhea, whereas those containing calcium or aluminium may cause constipation. Long-term use of antacids containing aluminium may increase the risk of developing osteoporosis. In vitro studies have found a potential for acid rebound to occur due to antacid overuse, however the significance of this finding has been called into question.

== Properties of antacids ==
When an excess amount of acid is produced in the stomach, the natural mucous barrier that protects the lining of the stomach can degrade, leading to pain and irritation. There is also potential for the development of acid reflux, which can cause pain and damage to the esophagus. Antacids contain alkaline ions that chemically neutralize stomach gastric acid, reducing damage to the stomach lining and esophagus, and relieving pain. Some antacids also inhibit pepsin, an enzyme that can damage the esophagus in acid reflux.

Antacids do not directly inhibit acid secretion, and thus are distinct from acid-reducing drugs like H_{2}-receptor antagonists or proton pump inhibitors. Antacids do not kill the bacterium Helicobacter pylori, which causes most ulcers.

== Types ==
Antacids are mainly classified into two categories:

- Systemic (absorbable) antacids: They are water soluble and systemically absorbed and pass into the bloodstream. e.g. sodium bicarbonate or sodium citrate
- Non-systemic (non-absorbable) antacids: They are insoluble and not absorbed into systemic circulation. They only act in the stomach e.g. magnesium carbonate or calcium carbonate

== Interactions ==
Structural depiction of tetracycline metal chelation, where 'M' is a metal such as those found in antacids

Antacids are known to interact with several oral medications, including fluoroquinolone and tetracycline antibiotics, iron, itraconazole, and prednisone. Metal chelation is responsible for some of these interactions (e.g. fluoroquinolones, tetracyclines), leading to decreased absorption of the chelated drug. Some interactions may be due to the pH increase observed in the stomach following antacid ingestion, leading to increased absorption of weak acids, and decreased absorption of weak bases. Antacids also cause an increase in pH of the urine (alkalization), which may cause increased blood concentrations of weak bases, and increased excretion of weak acids.

A proposed method to mitigate the effects of stomach acidity and chelation on drug absorption is to space out the administration of antacids with interacting medications by at least two hours, however this method has not been well studied for drugs affected by urine alkalization.

There are concerns regarding interactions between delayed-release tablets and antacids, as antacids may increase the stomach pH to a point at which the coating of the delayed-release tablet will dissolve, leading to degradation of the drug if it is pH sensitive.

== Formulations ==
Antacids may be formulated with other active ingredients such as simethicone to control gas, or alginic acid to act as a physical barrier to acid.

=== Liquids ===
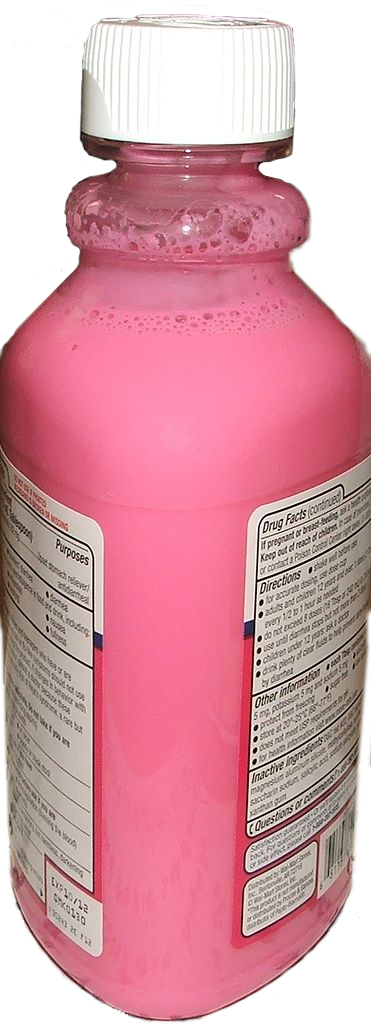
A bottle of liquid antacid containing bismuth subsalicylate as the active ingredient

Several liquid antacid preparations are marketed. Common liquid preparations include milk of magnesia and magnesium/aluminium combinations. A potential advantage of using a liquid preparation over a tablet is that liquids may provide quicker relief, however this may coincide with a shorter duration of action.

=== Tablets ===
==== Chewable tablets ====
Chewable tablets are one of the most common forms of antacids, most frequently made from carbonate or hydroxide salts, and are readily available over the counter. Upon reaching the stomach, the powdered antacid salts bind to hydronium (H^{+}) ions, producing chloride salts, carbon dioxide, and water. This process reduces the concentration of H^{+} ions in the stomach, raising the pH and neutralizing the acid. Common carbonate salts available in tablet form include those of calcium, magnesium, aluminium, and sodium.

Some common American brands are Tums, Gaviscon chewable tablets, and Maalox chewable tablets.

==== Effervescent tablets ====
Effervescent tablets are tablets which are designed to dissolve in water, and then release carbon dioxide. Common ingredients include citric acid and sodium bicarbonate, which react when in contact with water to produce carbon dioxide. Effervescent antacids may also contain aspirin, sodium carbonate, or tartaric acid. Those containing aspirin may cause further gastric irritation and ulceration due to aspirin's effects on the mucous membrane of the stomach.

== Brand names ==
Some brands include Alka-Seltzer, Gaviscon, Tums, Gelusil and Eno.
