= Museum of the Apopkans =

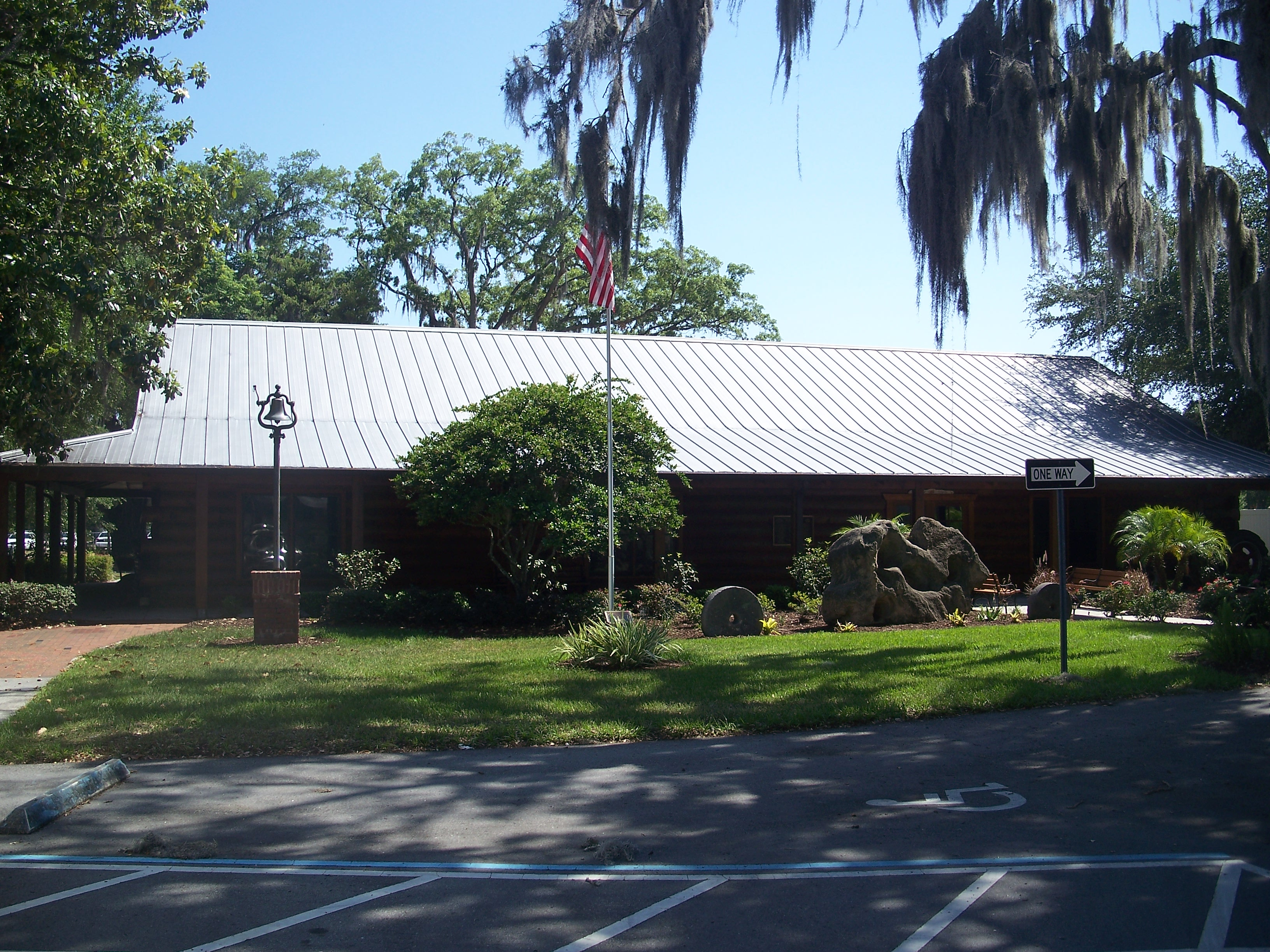
- Museum of the Apopkans

- Location within Florida
- Established: 1968
- Location: 122 East Fifth Street; Apopka, Florida
- Coordinates: 28.67188°N 81.50899°W
- Type: History museum
- Presidents: Maribel Brinkle (President of the Apopka Historical Society, 2020)
- Curator: Lorena Potter
- Public transit access: Lynx bus Orlando Route 17 to Apopka Superstop, Ocoee/Pine Hills Route 44 to Apopka Superstop, or use Apopka Circulator Route 405 within Apopka.
- Website: apopkamuseum.com

The Museum of the Apopkans is located at 122 East Fifth Street, Apopka, Florida. It contains exhibits depicting the history of Apopka and Northwest Orange County Pioneers of Apopka, Apopka Historical Society and Museum website and is run by the Apopka Historical Society.

== History ==
The Museum of the Apopkans started in 1968 but it was incorporated in 1971 to be a not-for-profit institution. The initial board of directors included President Mrs. Elizabeth Grossenbacher, Vice-President Mrs. Mildred S. Whiteside, Secretary Mrs. Reba R. Evans, Curator Mr. Edward A. Miner, and directors Mayor John H. Land, Miss Elin Larson, and Miss Mary Lee Welch.

== Accomplishments ==
The Apopka Historical Society, with many prominent community members including John H. Land, has been principal in obtaining historical status to many homes in the community.

=== National Historic Recognition ===
- Waite-Davis House, added 1990 (#90001127) AKA Leslie P. Waite House at 5 S. Central Ave, Apopka, Florida, USA.
- Mitchill-Tibbetts House, added 1991 (#91001661) AKA Miner House is at 21 E. Orange St, Apopka, Florida, USA.
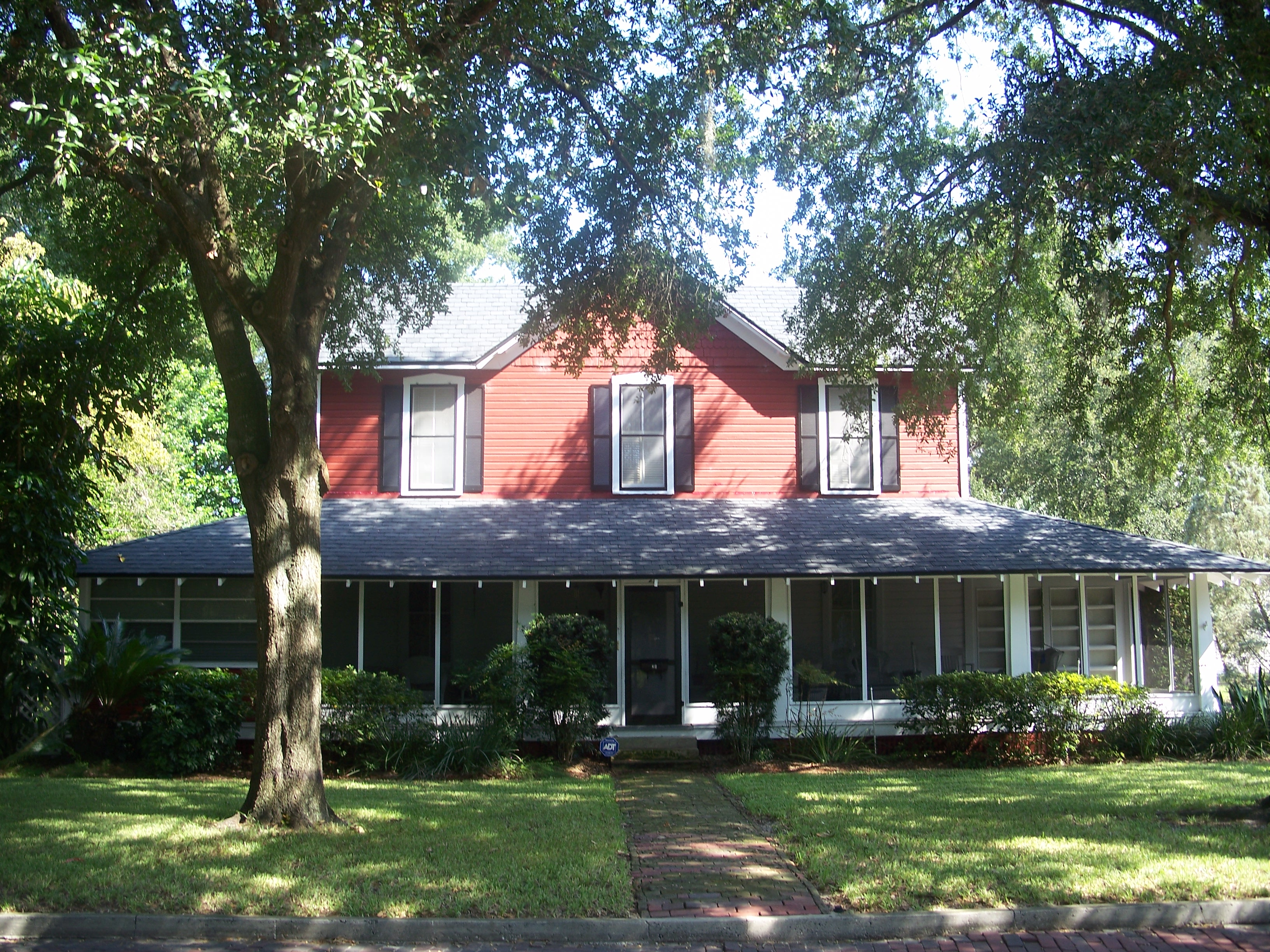
  Mitchill-Tibbetts House
- The Apopka Seaboard Air Line Railway Depot was added in 1993 to the National Register of Historic Places (#93000134). It is located at 36 E. Station St, Apopka, Florida, USA.
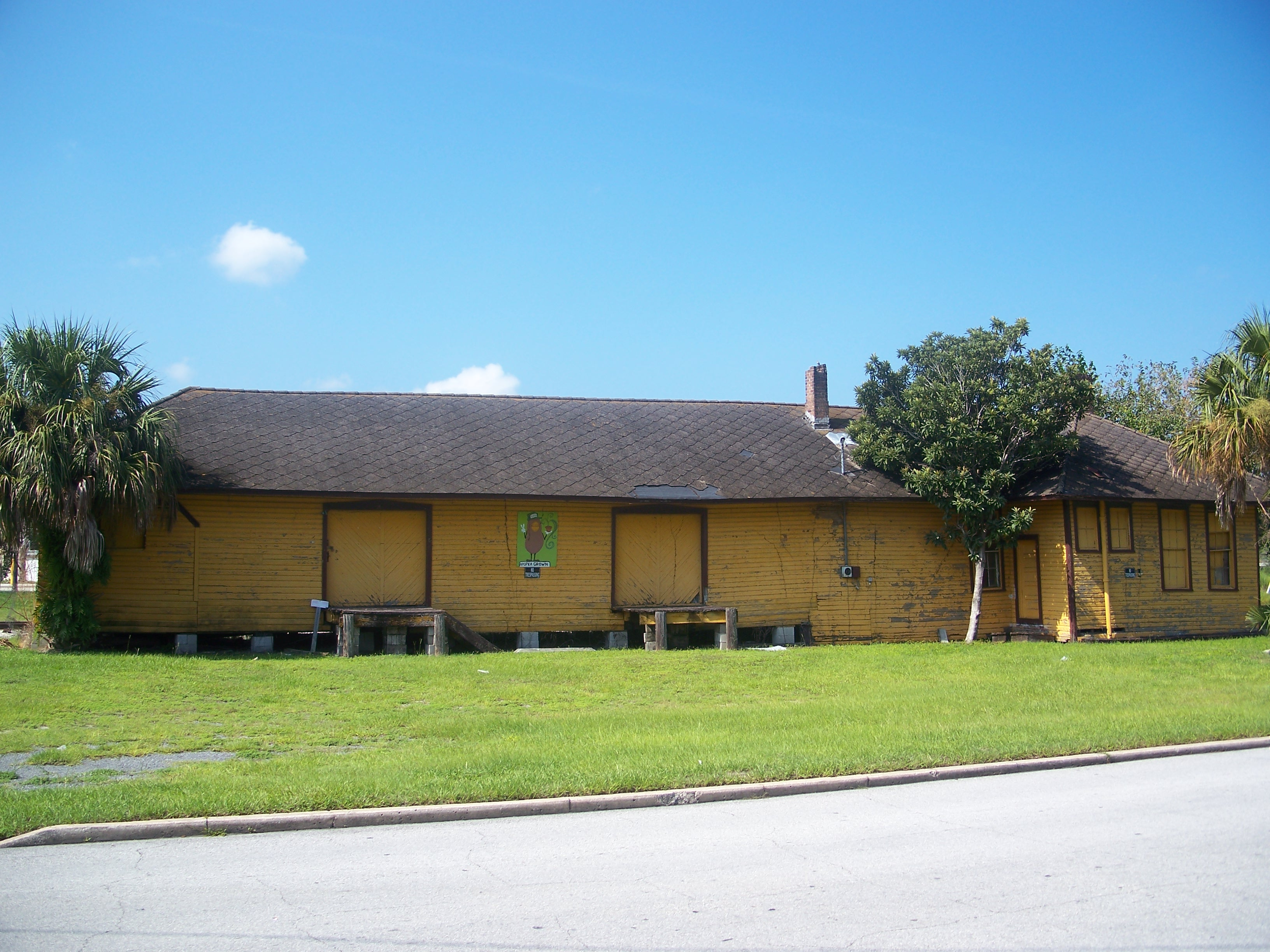
  Apopka Seaboard Air Line Railway Depot
- Carroll Building placed in the National Register of Historic Places in 1993 (#93000135) 407-409 S. Park Ave, Apopka, Florida, USA.
- Ryan & Company Lumber Yard added 1993 (#93000074) AKA Ryan Bros., Inc., 215 E. Fifth St, Apopka, Florida, USA.

=== Florida State Historic Recognition ===
1. Dr. Howard A. Kelly Park, 400 East Kelly Park Road
2. Oldest Masonic Lodge Building in Continuous use in Florida, E. Main St. and Alabama Ave.
3. Community of Piedmont, Peidmont-Wekiwa Rd. between Orange Blossom Trail and Apopka Blvd.
4. Lovell's Landing at Lake Apopka, 2929 Binion Rd. Magnolia Park
5. Episcopal Church of The Holy Spirit
6. Apopka Schoolhouse, Edgewood/Greenwood Cemetery

=== Florida State Special Award ===
- The Sydonie mansion 5538 Sydonie Drive, Zellwood, Florida, USA (construction began in 1895 and completed in 1904), being one home receiving special recognition for restoration by the State of Florida.
