= Mungan =

Mungan is a Turkish surname. Notable people with the surname include:

- Esra Mungan, Turkish academic
- Murathan Mungan (born 1955), Turkish author, playwright, and poet
- Zeynel Mungan (born 1952), Turkish scientist

== See also ==
- Mungan Syndrome
