= APD =

APD may refer to:

== Medicine ==
- Acid peptic diseases
- Afferent pupillary defect
- Antimicrobial Peptide Database
- Antipsychotic drug
- Antisocial personality disorder
- Auditory processing disorder
- Autoimmune progesterone dermatitis
- Automated peritoneal dialysis
- Avoidant personality disorder
- Pamidronic acid

== Police departments ==
- Airport Police Division, Singapore
- Akron Police Department, Ohio, United States
- Albuquerque Police Department, New Mexico, United States
- Amtrak Police Department, United States
- Anchorage Police Department, Alaska, United States
- Annapolis Police Department, Maryland, United States
- Antioch Police Department, California, United States
- Apopka Police Department, Florida, United States
- Arcadia Police Department, California, United States
- Atlanta Police Department, Georgia, United States
- Aurora Police Department, Colorado, United States
- Austin Police Department, Texas, United States

== Transport ==
- Air Passenger Duty, an excise duty levied on passengers flying from UK airports
- Albany Port Railroad, United States
- APD-40, a highway in Tennessee, United States
- Appledore (Kent) railway station, United Kingdom

== Other uses ==
- Air Products & Chemicals, an American industrial gas and chemical company
- Alliance for Democracy (Dominican Republic) (Spanish: Alianza por la Democracia), a Dominican Republic political party
- Alpha Phi Delta, an American college fraternity
- American political development
- Apple Accessory Products Division, now The Keyboard Company
- Avalanche photodiode
- High-speed transport, in the United States Navy
- Peace Through Law Association (French: Association de la paix par le droit, a French pacifist organisation
- Sudanese Arabic, a variety of the Arabic language
