= APDS =

APDS may refer to:

- Activated PI3K delta syndrome, medical condition
- Armour-piercing discarding sabot, projectile
- Augusta Preparatory Day School, school in United States
- Androgynous Peripheral Docking System, spacecraft docking mechanism

== See also ==
- APD (disambiguation)
