= Zeynel Mungan =

Turkish scientist (born 1952)

- Born: December 21, 1952 (age 73); Diyarbakır, Turkey
- Education: Istanbul University
- Known for: Mungan Syndrome
- Scientific career
- Fields: Medicine, Gastroenterology
- Workplaces: Istanbul University; Tulane University; American Hospital Istanbul

Zeynel Mungan (born December 21, 1952) is a Turkish professor of medicine, recognized for his academic achievements in the field of gastroenterology.

== Career ==
Zeynel Mungan, born in Diyarbakır, Turkey in 1952, received his medical degree at the Medical Faculty of Istanbul University in 1977. He was appointed to Associate Professor in 1988 and Professorship in 1995 in the same university. Between the years 1990 and 1992, Dr. Mungan worked as a Research Associate Professor at New Orleans, Tulane University and has been awarded the Kemal Akdamar GI Research Fellowship.

He was Head of Gastroenterohepatology in Istanbul University between 2005 and 2010 and President of the Istanbul Branch of Turkish Gastroenterology Association between 1999 and 2007.

Dr. Mungan is a Fellow of the American College of Gastroenterology, Fellow of the European Board of Gastroenterology and a member of the Turkish Gastroenterology Association. He is the author of more than 100 papers published in international and Turkish journals and gastroenterology textbooks, mostly in the fields of endoscopy, GI peptides, pituitary adenylate cyclase-activating peptide (PACAP), irritable bowel syndrome (IBS), acid-peptic diseases and gastrointestinal motility. Dr. Mungan is also on the editorial board of Gastroenterology Research and Practice, Best Research and Practice Clinical Gastroenterology, and The Turkish Journal of Gastroenterology.

== Family ==
He is married with two children and lives in Istanbul.

== Membership in professional organizations ==
- American College of Gastroenterology
- American Gastroenterology Association
- International Association of Surgeons, Gastroenterologists and Oncologists
- European Crohn's and Colitis Organization
- Turkish Gastroenterology Association (Turkish: Türk Gastroenteroloji Derneği)
- Türk Tıp Derneği
- Karaciğer Araştırmaları Derneği
- Gastrointestinal Motilite Derneği

== Works ==
=== Articles ===
1. Mungan Z, Ertan A, Hammer RA, Arimura A: Effect of pituitary adenylate cyclase activating polypeptide on rat pancreatic exocrine secretion. Peptides, 12:559-562, (1991).
2. Mungan Z, Ozmen V, Ertan A, Arimura A: Pituitary adenylate cyclase activating polypeptide-27 (PACAP-27) inhibits pentagastrin-stimulated gastric acid secretion in conscious rats. Regulatory Peptides, 38:199-206, (1992).
3. Mungan Z, Ozmen V, Ertan A, Coy DH, Baylor LM, Rice JC, Rossowski WJ: Structural requirements for galanin inhibition of pentagastrin-stimulated gastric acid secretion in conscious rats: Effect of potent novel rat galanin agonist. Eur J Pharmacol, 214:53-57, (1992).
4. Rossowski WJ, Zacharia S, Mungan Z, Ozmen V, Ertan A, Baylor LM, Jiang NY, Coy DH:Reduced gastric acid inhibitory effect of a pGIP(1-30) NH2 fragment with potent pancreatic amylase inhibitory activity. Regulatory Peptides, 39:9-17, (1992).
5. Mungan Z, Arimura A, Ertan A, Rossowski WJ, Coy DH: Pituitary adenylate cyclase activating polypeptide relaxes rat gastrointestinal smooth muscle. Scan J Gastroenterol, 27:375-380, (1992).
6. Coy DH, Mungan Z, Rossowski WJ, Cheng BL, Lin JT, Mrozinski JE, Jensen RT: Development of a potent bombesin receptor antagonist with prolonged in vivo inhibitory activity on bombesin-stimulated amylase and protein release in the rat. Peptides, 13:775-781, (1992).
7. Sotaniemi EA, Mungan Z, Risteli L, Stenback FG, Ökten A, Yalcın S, Risteli J: Serum type III procollagen and basal membrane antigens in hepatitis B virus liver disease. Eur J Intern Med, 3:131-139, (1992).
8. Rossowski WJ, Zacharia S, Jiang NY, Mungan Z, Mills MR, Ertan A, Coy DH: Galanin; Structure-dependent effect on pancreatic amylase secretion and jejunal strip contraction. Eur J Pharmacol, 240:259-267, (1993).
9. Mungan Z, Hammer RA, Akarca US, Komaki G, Ertan A, Arimura A: Effect of PACAP on gastric acid secretion in rats. Peptides, 16:1051-1056, (1995).
10. Gürel S, Beşışık F, Demir K, Mungan Z, Kaymakoğlu S, Boztaş G, Çakaloğlu Y, Yeğinsü O, Ökten A: After eradication of Helicobacter pylori infection relapse is a serious problem in Turkey. J Clin Gastroenterol, 28:241-244, (1999)
11. Demir K, Okten A, Kaymakoglu S, Dinçer D, Beşışık F, Çevikbaş U, Özdil S, Boztaş G, Mungan Z, Çakaloğlu Y: Tuberculous peritonitis- reports of 26 cases, detailing diagnostic and therapeutic problems. Eur J Gastroenterology & Hepatology, 13:581-585, (2001)
12. Besısık F, Sürücü F, Mungan Z, Dinçer D, Kapran Y, Kaymakoglu S, Çevikbaş U. Helicobacter pylori eradication lowers esophageal sphincter pressures in functional dyspepsia patients. Hepato-Gastroenterology, 48:1772-5 (2001)
13. Dinçer D, Besısık F, Sahin E, Demir K, Tuncer I, Cevikbas U, Mungan Z, Boztas G, Ozdil S, Cakaloglu Y, Otken A: Intestinal metaplasia of the gastric cardia: a study from Turkey. Hepato-Gastroenterology, 49:1153-6 (2002)
14. Danalioglu A, Kaymakoglu S, Mungan Z, Karaca C, Demir K, Durakoglu Z, Besisik F, Boztas G, Cakaloglu Y, Okten A. Efficacy of cyclosporin in severe ulcerative colitis attack. Turk J Gastroenterol. 13:130-3 (2002)
15. Durakoglu Z, Boztas G, Sezgil A, Kaymakoglu S, Dincer D, Ozdil S, Besisik F, Mungan Z, Okten A. Alverine induced toxic hepatitis: a case report. Turk J Gastroenterol. 13:226-8, (2002)
16. Kaymakoglu S, Kahraman T, Kudat H, Demir K, Cakaloglu Y, Adalet I, Dincer D, Besısık F, Boztas G, Sozen AB, Mungan Z, Okten A. Hepatopulmonary syndrome in noncirrhotic portal hypertensive patients. Dig Dis Sci, 48:556-60 (2003)
17. Mungan Z, Akyuz F, Bugra Z, Yonal O, Ozturk S, Acar A, Cevikbas U. A family of visceral myopathy; with pseudo-obstruction, megaduodenum, Barrett's esophagus and cardiac abnormalities. Am J Gastroenterol, 98:2556-60 (2003)
18. Ozdil S, Demir K, Boztas G, Danalioglu A, Karaca C, Akyuz F, Aksoy N, Kaymakoglu S, Mungan Z, Besisik F, Cakaloglu Y, Okten A. Crohn's disease; analysis of 105 patients. Hepatogastroenterology. 50 Suppl 2:cclxxxvii-ccxci.(2003)
19. Danalioglu A, Kaymakoglu S, Mungan Z, Karaca C, Demir K, Durakoglu Z, Besisik F, Boztas G, Cakaloglu Y, Okyen A. Cyclosporin for severe ulcerative colitis attacks. Hepatogastroenterology. 50 Suppl 2:ccxcviii-ccc.(2003)
20. Danalioglu A, Cakaloglu Y, Karaca C, Aksoy N, Akyuz F, Ozdil S, Demir K, Besisik F, Boztas G, Mungan Z, Kaymakoglu S, Okten A. Terlipressin and albumin combination treatment in hepatorenal syndrome. Hepatogastroenterology. 50 Suppl 2:ccciii-cccv. (2003)
21. Cetin K, Gungor B, Isik A, Ahmet D, Filiz A, Nevzat A, Sadakat O, Cengiz D, Zeynel M. The effect of pneumatic balloon dilatation on gastric emptying in patients with achalasia. Hepatogastroenterology. 2003 Dec;50 Suppl 2:ccci-cccii.
22. Ozdil S, Akyüz F, Pinarbaşı B, Demir K, Karaca Ç, Kaymakoğlu S, Mungan Z, Beşışık F, Cakaloğlu Y, Okten A. Ulcerative colitis: analyses of 116 cases (do extraintestinal manifestations effect the time to catch remission?). Hepatogastroenterology, 51:768-70 (2004)
23. Karaca Ç, Pınarbaşı B, Danalıoğlu A, Akyüz F, Kaymakoğlu S, Özdil S, Boztaş G, Mungan Z. Liver abscess as a rare complication of Crohn's disease: A case report. Turk J Gastroenterol, 15:45-48, (2004)
24. Akbayir N, Alkim C, Erdem L, Sökmen HM, Sungun A, Baş T, Turgut S, Mungan Z. Heterotopic gastric mucosa in the cervical esophagus (inlet patch): Endoscopic prevalence, histological and clinical characteristics. Journal of Gastroenterology and Hepatology, 19:891-6 (2004)
25. Boztaş G, Mungan Z, Özdil S, Akyüz F, Karaca C, Demir K, Kaymakoglu S, Besısık F, Çakaaloglu Y, Ökten A. Pneumatic balloon dilatation in primary achalasia: The long term following results . Hepatogastroenterology. 52:475-80,(2005)
26. Poturoğlu Ş, Mungan Z, Boztaş G, Kaymakoğlu S, Ozdil S, Akyüz F, Aksoy N, Kamaci S, Pınarbaşı B, Çevikbaş U, Ökten A. Peritoneal amyloidosis caused by familial mediterranean fever. J Gastroenterol Hepatol, 20:325-6, (2005)
27. Akbayir N, Sokmen HM, Calis AB, Bolukbas C, Erdem L, Alkim C, Sakiz D, Mungan Z. Heterotopic gastric mucosa in the cervical esophagus: could this play a role in the pathogenesis of laryngopharyngeal reflux in a subgroup of patients with posterior laryngitis? Scand J Gastroenterol. 40:1149-56 (2005)
28. Ibrisim D, Cakaloglu Y, Akyuz F, Karadag A, Ozdil S, Besisik F, Mungan Z, Okten A. Treatment of hepatic hydrothorax with terlipressin in a cirrhotic patient. Scand J Gastroenterol. 41:862-5, (2006)
29. Akyuz F, Ibrisim D, Balik E, Yonal O, Kaymakoglu S, Bugra D, Mungan Z. Evaluation of malignancy risk and endoscopic follow up in achalasia: Case report. Turk J Gastroenterol. 17:46-49, (2006)
30. Yonal O, Hatırnaz O, Akyuz F, Ozbek U, Demir K, Kaymakoglu S, Otken A, Mungan Z. HFE gene mutation, chronic liver disease, and iron overload In Turkey. Dig Dis Sci. 52:3298-302 (2007).
31. Akyuz F, Demir K, Ozdil S, Aksoy N, Poturoglu S, Ibrisim D, Kaymakoglu S, Besisik F, Boztas G, Cakaloglu Y, Mungan Z, Cevikbas U. Otken A. The effects of rosiglitazone, metformin, and diet with exercise in nonalcoholic fatty liver disease. Dig Dis Sci. 52:2359-67, (2007)
32. Yonal O, Hatirnaz O, Akyuz F, Koroglu G, Ozbek U, Cefle K, Mungan Z. Definition of C282Y mutation in a hereditary hemochromatosis family from Turkey. Turk J Gastroenterol. 18:53-57 (2007)
33. Deglincerti A, De Giorgio R, Cefle K, Devoto M, Pippucci T, Castegnaro G, Panza E, Barbara G, Cogliandro RF, Mungan Z, Palanduz S, Corinaldesi R, Romeo G, Seri M, Stanghellini V. A novel locus for syndromic chronic idiopathic intestinal pseudo-obstruction maps to chromosome 8q23-q24. Eur J Hum Genet. 15:889-97 (2007)
34. Demir K, Akyuz F, Ozdil S, Aksoy N, Kaymakoglu S, Poturoglu S, Akyüz U, Besisik F, Boztas G, Mungan Z, Cevikbas U, Cakaloglu Y, Okten A. What is the reason of elevated alanine aminotransferase level in HBeAg negative patients with low viremia: NAFLD or chronic hepatitis? Ann Hepatol. 6:92-6 (2007)
35. Mungan Z, Pinarbaşi B, Kaymakoğlu S. Eosinophilic esophagitis: Case report. Turk J Gastroenterol. 18:100-2 (2007)
36. Ahishali E, Pinarbasi B, Akyuz F, Ibrisim D, Kaymakoglu S, Mungan Z. A case of Aeromonas hyDROPhyhila enteritis in the course of ulcerative colitis. Eur J Intern Med. 18:430-1 (2007)
37. Ahishali E, Boztas A, Akyuz F, Ibrisim D, Poturoglu S, Pinarbasi B, Ozdil S, Mungan Z. Response to Hepatitis B Vaccination in Patients with Celiac Disease. Dig Dis Sci. (2007)
38. Ermis F, Akyuz F, Demir K, Besisik F, Boztas G, Mungan Z. Rapidly progressive HCV cirrhosis in a hypogammaglobulinemic patient. Intern Med. 47:415-7 (2008)
39. Pınarbaşı B, Poturoglu Ş, Yanar H, Güven K, Akyüz F, Dizdaroğlu F, Güllüoğlu M, Taviloğlu K, Kaymakoğlu S, Mungan Z. A rare cause of hemosuccus pancreaticus: Primary splenic artery aneurysm ruptured into pancreatic serous cystadenoma. Turk J Gastroenterol 19:57-63 (2008)
40. Mungan Z, Pınarbaşı B, Akyuz F, Bektas H, Akyuz A. Wireless endoscopy capsule remaining safely for a long time. Dig Dis Sci 53:1422-3 (2008)
41. Ibrişim D, Cevikbaş U, Akyüz F, Poturoğlu S, Ahishali E, Güllüoğlu M, Demir K, Beşişik F, Boztaş G, Ozdil S, Cakaloğlu Y, Mungan Z, Okten A, Kaymakoğlu S. Intestinal metaplasia in portal hypertensive gastropathy: a frequent pathology. Eur J Gastroenterol Hepatol. 20:874-80 (2008)
42. Akyuz F, Mungan Z. Diagnostic capability of capsule endoscopy in small bowel diseases. Gastroenterology Research 2:81-5 (2009)
43. Pinarbasi B, Kaymakoglu S, Matur Z, Akyuz F, Demir K, Besisik F, Ozdil S, Boztas G, Cakaloglu Y, Mungan Z, Okten A. Are acquired hepatocerebral degeneration and hepatic myelopathy reversible? J Clin Gastroenterol43:176-81 (2009)
44. Mungan Z, Pinarbasi B, Bakir B, Gulluoglu M, Baran B, Akyuz F, Demir K, Kaymakoglu S. Congenital portal vein aneurysm associated with peliosis hepatis and intestinal lymphangiectasia. Gastroenterol Res Pract. 2009:479264 (2009)
45. Poturoglu S, Kaymakoglu S, Gurel Polat N, Ibrisim D, Ahishali E, Akyuz F, Badur S, Demir K, Mungan Z. A new agent for tumour necrosis factor-alpha inhibition: In vitro effects of dipyridamole in Crohn's disease. Scand J Clin Lab Invest. 69:696-702 (2009)
46. Akyüz F, Arici S, Ermiş F, Mungan Z. Utility of esophageal manometry and pH-metry in gastroesophageal reflux disease before surgery. Turk J Gastroenterol. 20:261-5 (2009)
47. Ahishali E, Demir K, Ahishali B, Akyuz F, Pinarbasi B, Poturoglu S, Ibrisim D, Gulluoglu M, Ozdil S, Besisik F, Kaymakoglu S, Boztas G, Cakaloglu Y, Mungan Z, Canberk Y, Okten A. Electron microscopic findings in non-alcoholic fatty liver disease: is there a difference between hepatosteatosis and steatohepatitis? J Gastroenterol Hepatol. 25:619-26 (2010)
48. Yonal O, Akyuz F, Demir K, Ciftci S, Keskin F, Pinarbasi B, Uyanikoglu A, Issever H, Ozdil S, Boztas G, Besisik F, Kaymakoglu S, Cakaloglu Y, Mungan Z, Okten A. Decreased Prohepcidin Levels in Patients with HBV-Related Liver Disease: Relation with Ferritin Levels. Dig Dis Sci. 55:3548-51(2010)
49. Akyuz F, Pinarbasi B, Ermis F, Uyanikoglu A, Demir K, Ozdil S, Besisik F, Kaymakoglu S, Boztas G, Mungan Z. Is portal hypertensive enteropathy an important additional cause of blood loss in portal hypertensive patients? Scand J Gastroenterol. 45:1497-502 (2010)
50. Lanas A, Aabakken L, Fonseca J, Mungan Z, Papatheodoridis GV, Piessevaux H, Cipolletta L, Nuevo J, Tafalla M. Clinical predictors of poor outcomes among patients with nonvariceal upper gastrointestinal bleeding in Europa. Aliment Pharnacol Ther. 33:1225-33 (2011)
51. Sen F, Pinarbaşi B, Işsever H, Akyüz F, Mungan Z, Kaymakoğlu S. Postprandial platelet-poor plasma 5-hyroxytryptamine concentrations during diarrhea and constipation periods of alternating type irritable bowel syndrome patients. Turk J Gastroenterol 22:270-8 (2011)
52. Ermis F, Akyuz F, Uyanıkoglu A, Kurt R, Pinarbasi B, Nazik H, Kaymakoglu S, Mungan Z. Second-line levofloxacin-based triple therapy's efficiency for Helicobacter pylori eradication in patients with peptic ulcer. South Med J 104:579-83 (2011)
53. Akyüz F, Cakaloğlu Y, Pinarbaşi B, Demir K, Akyüz U, Ozdil S, Beşişik F, Boztaş G, Mungan Z, Kaymakoğlu S. Anticoagulant therapy and Budd-Chiari syndrome : is it successful ? Hepatogastroenterology 58:900-3 (2011)
54. Ermis F, Akyuz F, Arici S, Uyanikoglu A, Pinarbasi B, Demir K, Ozdil S, Besisik F, Kaymakoglu S, Boztas G, Cuhadaroglu C, Mungan Z. Effect of proton pump inhibitor (PPI) treatment in obstructive sleep apnea syndrome: An esophageal impedance-pHmetry study. Hepatogastroenterology 58:110-1 (2011)
55. Uyanikoglu A, Akyuz F, Ermis F, Arici S, Bas G, Cakirca M, Baran B, Mungan Z. Does cholecystectomy increase the esophageal alkaline reflux? Evaluation by Impedance-pH technique. J Neurogastroenterol Motil. 18:187-93 (2012)
56. Ermis F, Akyuz F, Mungan Z. Recurrence of Helicobacter pylori after eradication in patient with peptic ulcer. South Med J. 105:322-3 (2012)
57. Uyanıkoglu A, Danalıoğlu A, Akyüz F, Ermiş F, Güllüoğlu M, Kapran Y, Demir K, Özdil S, Beşışık F, Boztaş G, Mungan Z, Kaymakoğlu S. Etiologic factors of duodenal and gastric ulcers. Turk J Gastroenterol 23:99-103 (2012)
58. Mungan Z. Prevalence and demographic determinants of gastroesophageal reflux disease (GERD) in the Turkish general population: A population-based sectional study. Turk J Gastroenterol 23:323-32 (2012)
59. Akyuz F, Besisik F, Ustek D, Ekmekçi C, Uyar A, Pınarbasi B, Demir K, Ozdil S, Kaymakoglu S, Boztas G, Mungan Z, Gul A. Association of the MEFV gen variations with inflammatory bowel disease in Turkey. J Clin Gastroenterol Jul 17 (2012)

=== Book Contributions ===
1. Mungan, Z.: Üst Gastrointestinal sistem kanamaları. Acil Dahiliye, Ed. S.Çalangu-K.Güler, 4.Baskı, İstanbul 1995, s:315-334, 5.Baskı 1997, 6.Baskı 2002
2. Mungan, Z : Tükrük salgısı bozuklukları (s:1139-41), Disfaji (s:1141-52), Dispepsi (s:1217-42), Hematemez, Melena ve hematokezi (s:1243-66), Karında gaz (s:1267-75). Semptomdan Teşhise. Ed. V.Aleksanyan, 10.Baskı, İstanbul 2000
3. Mungan, Z.: Özofagus Hastalıkları (s:1-36), Üst Gastrointestinal Sistem Kanamaları (s: 75-88), İrritabl Barsak Sendromu (s: 243-250), Divertikülozis Koli (s: 251-254), Pnömotozis Sistoides İntestinalis (s:255-256). Gastroenterohepatoloji. Ed. A.Ökten, İstanbul 2001
4. Mungan, Z : Gastroözofageal Reflü Hastalığında Tanı. Aktüel Gastroenteroloji ve Hepatoloji, Ed E.Göksoy, İstanbul 2001, s:3-9, 2.baskı 2003
5. Mungan, Z: Non-kardiak göğüs ağrısı. (s: 73-75). Klinik Gastroenteroloji. Ed. F.Memik, Nobel, İstanbul 2005
6. Mungan, Z: Asit gelişimine neden olan periton hastalıkları (s:137-154). Klinik Pratikte Asitli Hasta Ed. A. Ökten. İstanbul. 2005
7. Mungan, Z: Gastroenteropankreatik hormon ve peptidler (s:1-16), Gastrinoma (s:69-76). GEP NET gastroenteropankreatik nöroendokrin tümörler. Ed. Y.Çakaloğlu. İstanbul. 2006
8. Mungan, Z: Gastrointestinal sistem hastalıklarına yaklaşım (s:785-794), Özofagus hastalıkları (s:795-814). İç Hastalıkları. Ed. K.Büyüköztürk. Istanbul 2007
9. Demir K, Mungan Z: Periton, mezenter, omentum ve diafragma hastalıkları (s:927-940). İç Hastalıkları. Ed. K.Büyüköztürk. Istanbul 2007
10. Mungan Z: Gastroözofageal reflü hastalığı (s:60-77), Proton pompası inhibitörleri (s.104-113). Gastroenteroloji. Ed.Z.Mungan, Istanbul 2010
