= Carroll Building (Apopka, Florida) =

- U.S. National Register of Historic Places
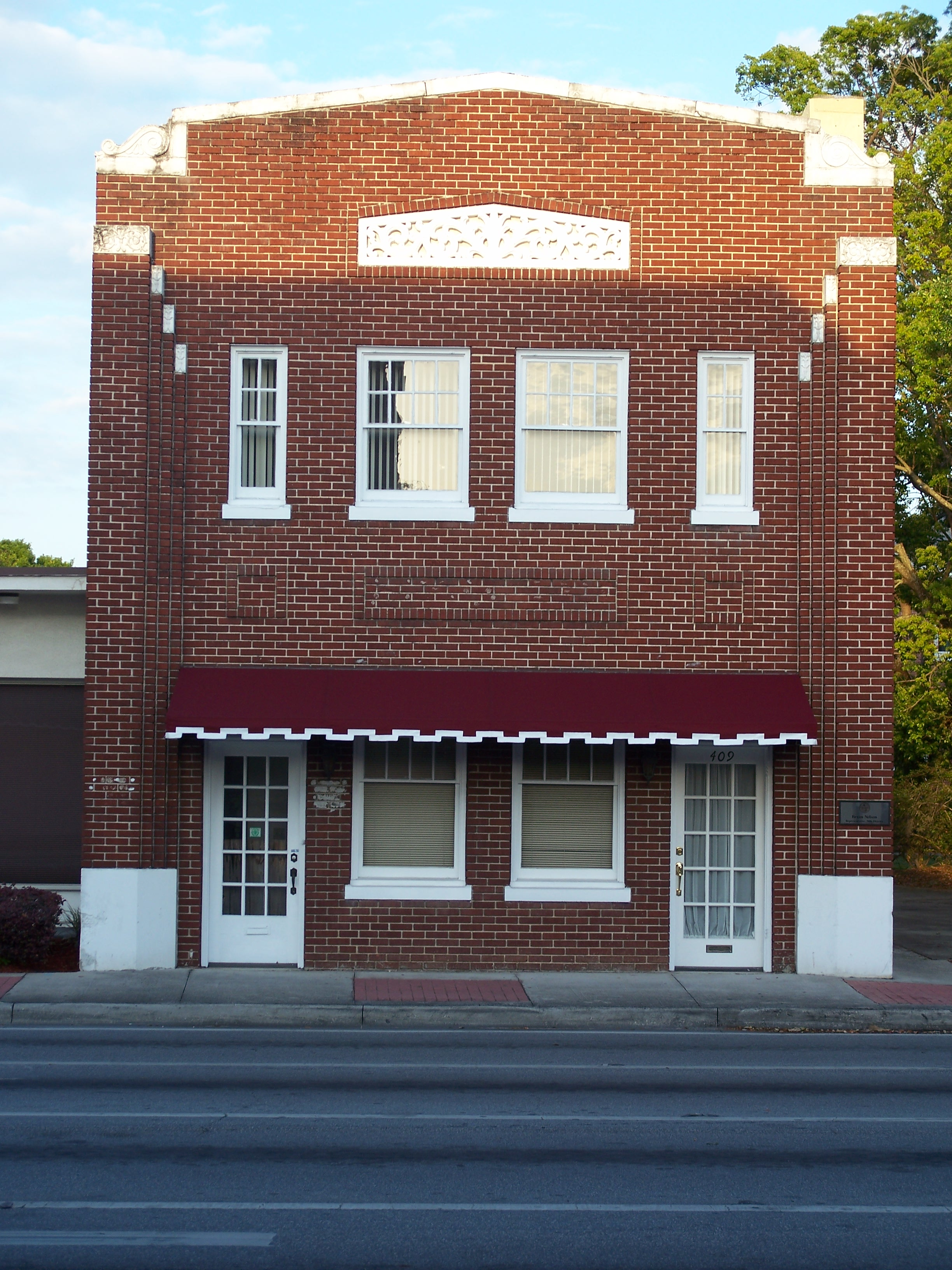

- Location within Florida Location within the United States
- Location: Apopka, Florida
- Coordinates: 28°40′17″N 81°30′34″W
- Built: 1932
- NRHP reference No.: 93000135
- Added to NRHP: 4 March 1993

The Carroll Building (also formerly the site of the Apopka Historical Society Museum) is a historic building in Apopka, Florida. It is located at 407-409 South Park Avenue. On March 4, 1993, it was added to the U.S. National Register of Historic Places. It currently serves as the site of Aunt Gingibread's Bakery.

The Apopka Historical Society now operates the Museum of the Apopkans at 122 East Fifth Street, Apopka, Florida.

== Gallery ==
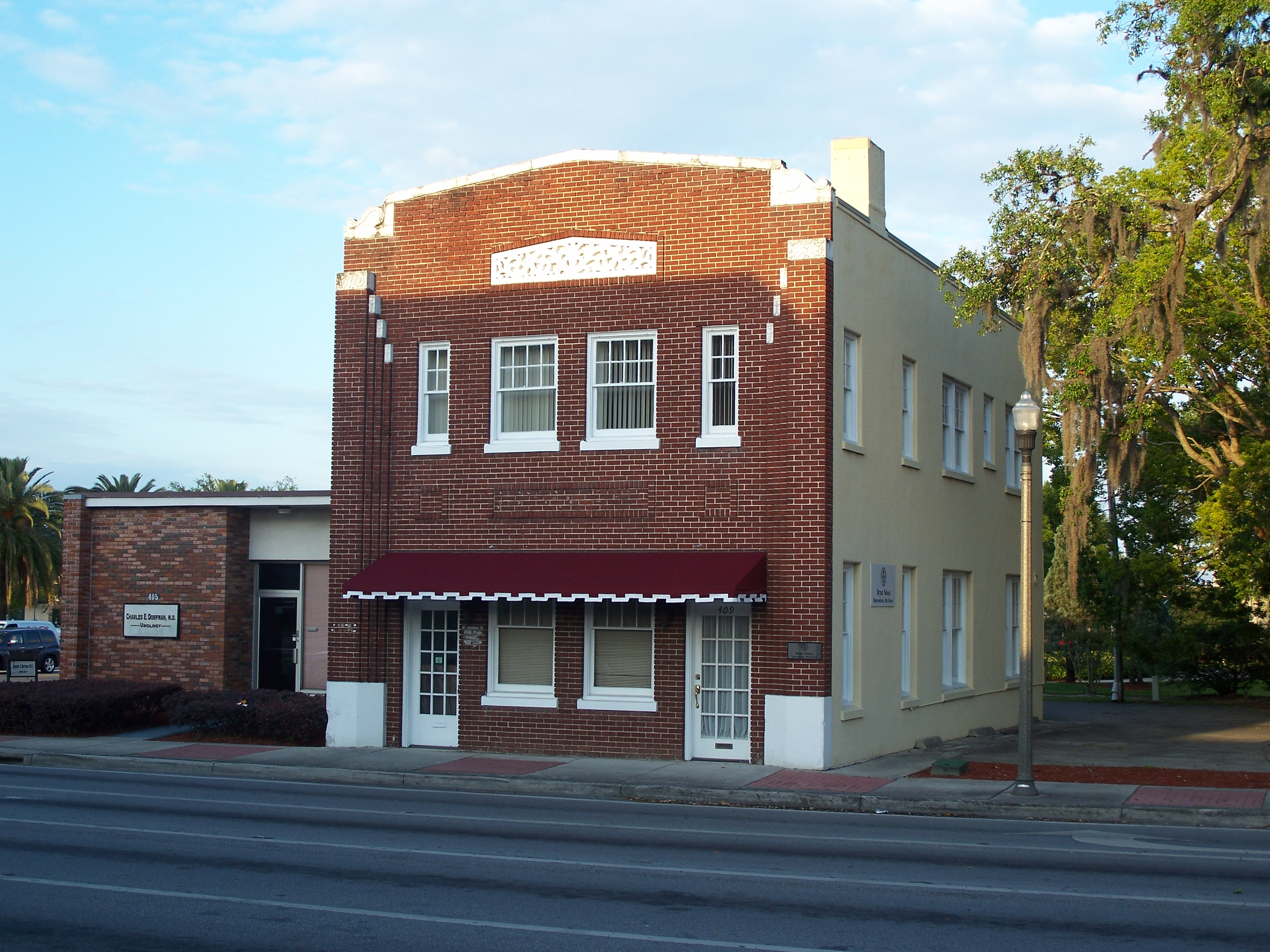
