= Apopka, Florida =

City in Florida, United States

- City
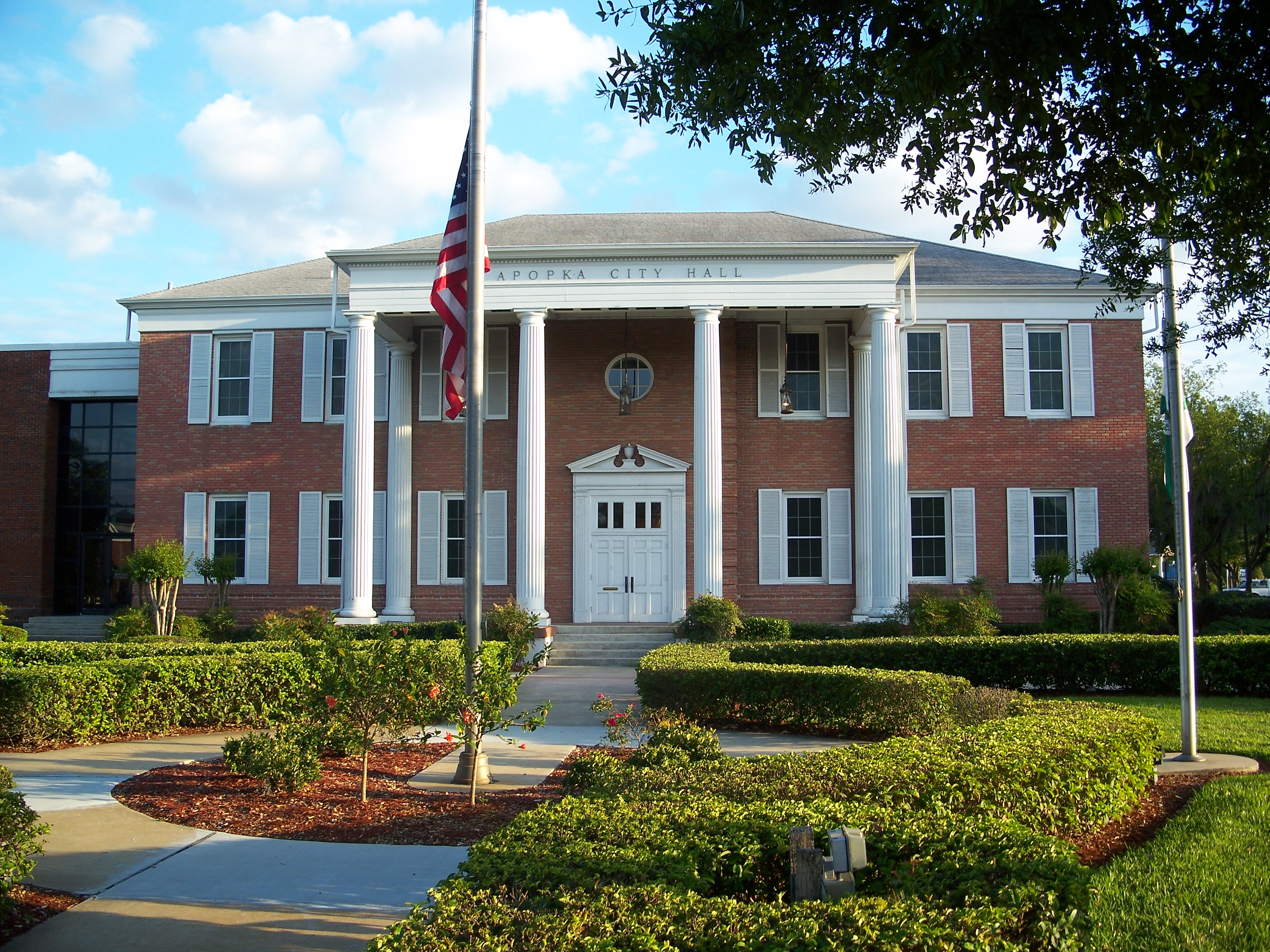
- Apopka City Hall in April 2007

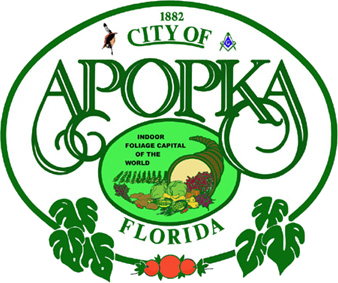
- Flag Seal
- Nickname: Indoor Foliage Capital of the World
- Location of Apopka in Orange County, Florida.
- Coordinates: 28°42′06″N 81°31′54″W
- Country: United States
- State: Florida
- County: Orange
- Incorporated (Town of Apopka City): 1882
- Incorporated (City of Apopka): 1919

Government
  - Type: Mayor–Commission
  - Mayor: Nick L Nesta III (R)

Area
  - Total: 35.97 sq mi (93.17 km^{2})
  - Land: 34.59 sq mi (89.60 km^{2})
  - Water: 1.38 sq mi (3.58 km^{2}) 4.07%
- Elevation: 92 ft (28 m)

Population (2020)
  - Total: 54,873
  - Estimate (2025): 65,552
  - Density: 1,586.2/sq mi (612.44/km^{2})
- Demonym: Apopkan
- Time zone: UTC−5 (EST)
  - Summer (DST): UTC−4 (EDT)
- ZIP codes: 32703, 32704, 32712
- Area codes: 321, 407, 689
- FIPS code: 12-01700
- GNIS feature ID: 2403103
- Website: www.apopka.gov

Apopka is a city in Orange County, Florida. The city's population was 54,873 at the 2020 census. It is part of the Orlando–Kissimmee–Sanford Metropolitan Statistical Area. Apopka comes from Seminole word Ahapopka for "potato-eating place".

Apopka is referred to as the "Indoor Foliage Capital of the World" due to the many greenhouse nurseries there.

== History ==
The earliest known inhabitants of the Apopka area were the Acuera people, members of the Timucua confederation. They had disappeared by 1730, probably decimated by diseases transmitted through Florida by Spanish colonists.

The Acuera were succeeded by refugees from Alabama and Georgia, who formed the new Seminole Indian tribe. They called the area Ahapopka. Aha, meaning "Potato," and papka, meaning "eating place". By the 1830s, this settlement numbered about 200, and was the birthplace of the chief Coacoochee (known in English as "Wild Cat").

At the conclusion of the Second Seminole War, the U.S. Congress passed the Armed Occupation Act of 1842, forcing surviving natives at Ahapopka to abandon their village and seek refuge deeper in the wilderness of the Florida peninsula.

The early American settlers built a major trading center on the foundations of the earlier Indian settlement. Their population was large enough by 1857 to support the establishment of a Masonic lodge. In 1859 the lodge erected a permanent meeting place at what is now the intersection of Main Street (U.S. Highway 441) and Alabama Avenue.

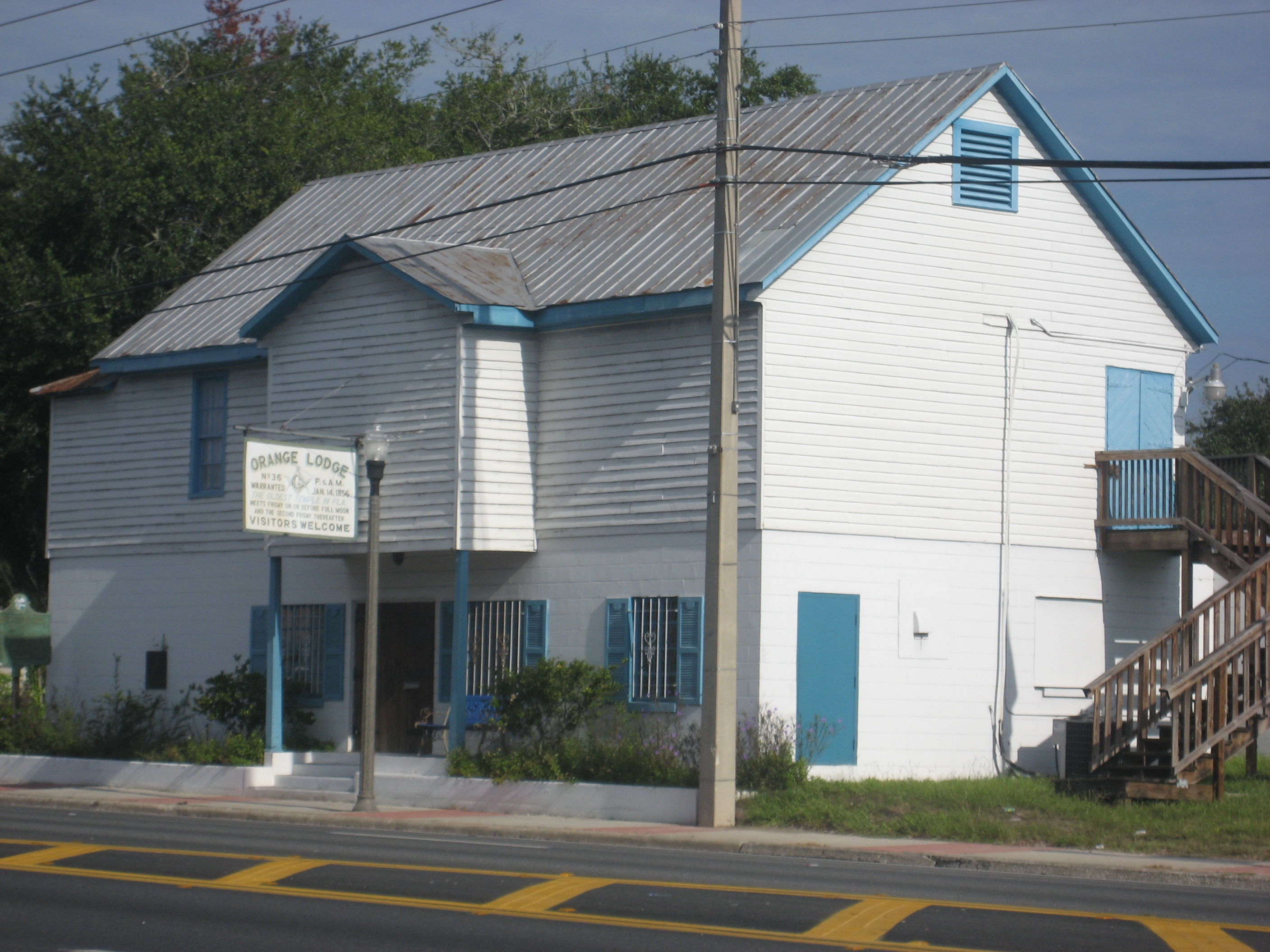
This is the 1859 historic building, The Lodge, that became the central point of the 1 mile square formation of the City of Apopka.

=== The Lodge ===
The settlers in the vicinity of "The Lodge" were largely isolated during the Civil War, but the area rebounded once peace was re-established, and a population boom followed the construction of railroad lines through the region.

In 1869, the Apopka Post Office opened.

=== Town of Apopka City ===
In 1882, the one mile in each direction of "The Lodge" or "Fudge Hall" was officially incorporated under the name "Town of Apopka City". In the 1890s, the town was contracted in size more than once due to difficult times.

In 1905, the Apopka City Council authorized incorporation of the Apopka Water, Light, and Ice Company. Councilman A.M. Starbird was appointed its manager, but it was not until voters approved a $9,000 bond in 1914 that he was able to contract with International Harvester Corporation to construct a power plant; as such, electricity was not available in the city until February 10, 1915. This independent utility company was one of many that were acquired by the Florida Public Service Corporation in the 1920s. They continued to manage the city's utility needs until the 1940s, when they sold off its ice plants to the Atlantic Company, its electric service to Florida Power Corporation, and its water services to Florida Utilities.

Between 1937 and 1968, a town ordinance forbade Black residents from living north of the railroad tracks.

=== Historic buildings ===
Five buildings in Apopka have been placed on the U.S. National Register of Historic Places through the Apopka Historical Society housed in the Museum of the Apopkans.

Year built	Building Name	Address	Image
1918	Apopka Seaboard Air Line Railway Depot	36 E Station St	Apopka Seaboard Air Line Railway Depot
1886	Waite-Davis House	5 S Central Ave	Waite-Davis House
1887	Mitchell-Tibbetts House	21 E Orange St	Mitchell-Tibbetts House
1920	Ryan & Company Lumber Yard	215 E Fifth St	Ryan & Company Lumber Yard
1932	Carroll Building (Apopka, Florida)	407-409 S Park Ave	Carroll Building

== Present-day Apopka ==
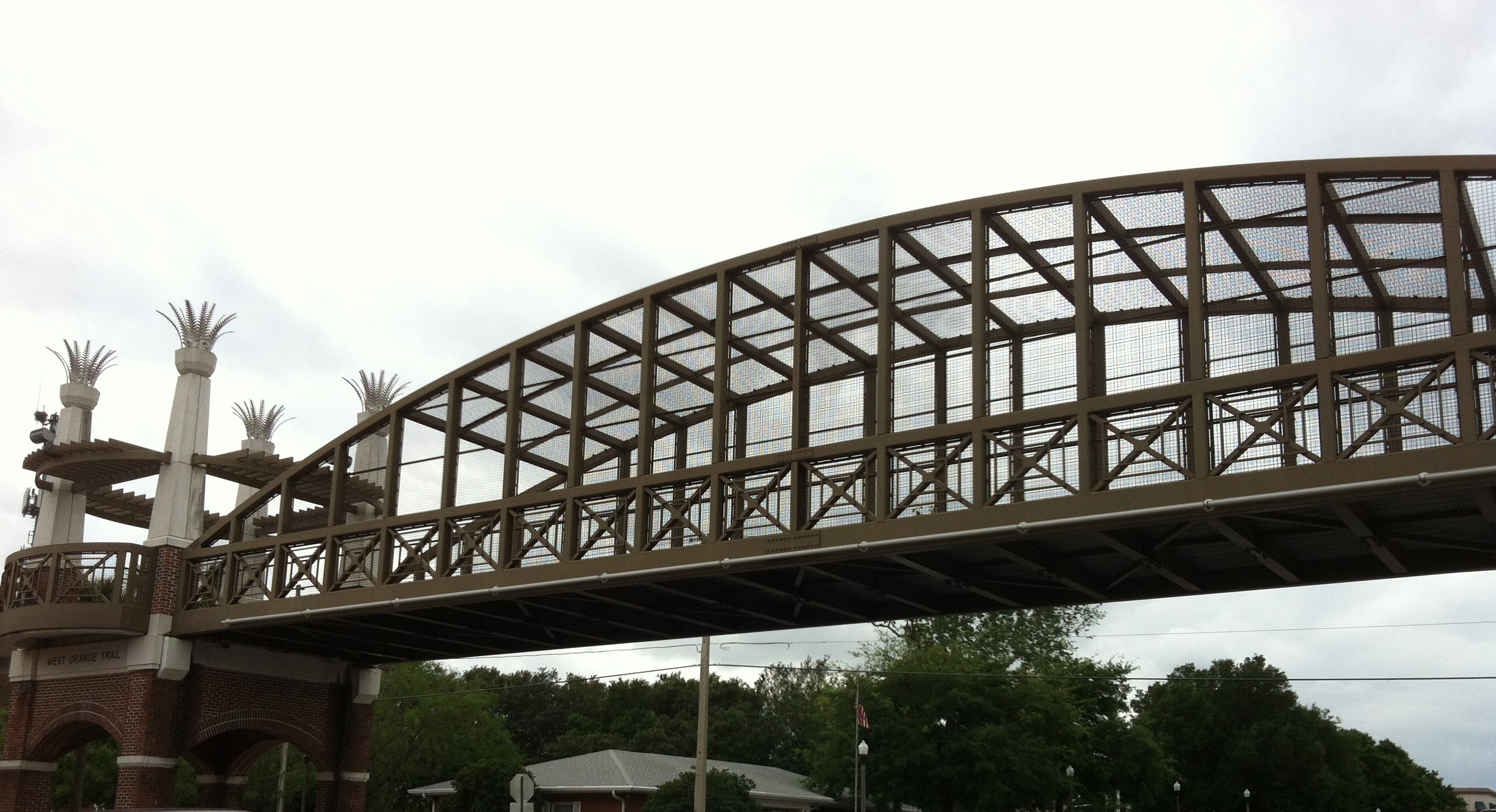
This bridge was built by Orange County, FL and the City of Apopka, FL over US Route 441 connecting two sections of the Rails-to-Trails system forming the West Orange Trail for bicyclists and pedestrians. It opened in June 2007.

Apopka is known for having one of the longest-serving mayors in the United States. John H. Land, first elected in 1949, served for over 61 years (with a short three-year gap), making him the longest-serving mayor in Florida and longest-serving full-time mayor in the United States through 2014. Apopka is served by the Apopka Police Department within city limits and the Orange County Sheriff's Department for unincorporated Apopka.

On April 8, 2014, Apopka City Commissioner Joe Kilsheimer won the election to succeed John H. Land as mayor. Kilsheimer was sworn in on April 22, 2014. The 2018 primary for mayor resulted in a landslide win for Bryan Nelson with 63.40% (4,103) of the vote to Kilsheimer's 36.6% (2,369). No runoff was required.

=== Mayors of the City of Apopka ===
Mayor	Oath	Term End	Term Years	Multi-Terms
James Daniel Fudge	1882	1885	3	
Jesse J. Combs	1885	1886	1	
Page McKinney	1886	1888	2	
Dr. Horatio S. Brewer	1888	1893	5	
R. C. Waters	1893	1895	2	
E. A. Jackson	1895	1896	1	
Andrew Jackson Lovell	1896	1905	9	₡
Joseph D Mitchill	1905	1912	7	₡
Adelbert M. Starbird	1912	1913	1	
Andrew Jackson Lovell	1913	1914	1	10
Walter R. McLeod	1914	1915	1	
Frank Davis	1915	1916	1	
Walter Newell	1916	1918	2	₡
Thomas B. Tower	1918	1919	1	
Walter P. Newell	1919	1920	1	3
Joseph D Mitchill	1920	1923	3	10
Edward Barker Morrey	1923	1926	3	
John Jewell	1926 Jan	1930 Dec	5	
Edward J. Ryan	1931 Jan	1934 Dec	3	
Gillen McClure	1935 Jan	1937 Dec	3	
Mark V. Ryan	1938 Jan	1940 Dec	3	
Leslie P. Waite	1941 Jan	1946 Dec	6	
Dr. Charles Henry Damsel	1947 Jan	1949 Dec	3	
John Horting Land	1950 Jan	1967 Dec	18	₡ Honor
Leonard Hurst	1968 Jan	1970 Dec	3	
John Horting Land	1971 Jan	2014 Mar	43.25	61.25
Joe Kilsheimer	2014 Apr	2018	4	
Bryan Nelson	2018 Apr 24	2026	8	
Nick Nesta III	2026 Apr 28			

- From 1882 to 1923 elections were held annually, then every three years, finally every four years as the city election codes were changed.
- Honor--Longest serving full-time mayor in the nation.
- ₡ indicates discontinuous terms of service.

==== Commission ====
The current commission of the City of Apopka, as of 28 April 2026, consists of five members, one strong mayor and four commissioners. Listed by seniority.

- Mayor--Nick L Nesta III
  - Mayor 2026-, Commissioner 2024-2026, 2022-2024
- Vice-Mayor--Diane Velazquez
  - Commissioner 2026-, 2020-2026, 2014-2018
- Commissioner Nadia L Anderson
  - Commissioner 2024-
- Commissioner Sam Ruth
  - Commissioner 2026-, 2014-2016
- Commissioner Jesi Baron
  - Commissioner 2026-

=== Development ===
Apopka is a fast-growing city. Most notable are new stores to the north of the city on US 441 in the location of the previous Dunn Citrus grove (the stretch of 441 which runs through the city is named after Fred N. Dunn). Due to the city's fast growth a new hospital, AdventHealth Apopka, was opened in 2017.

The John Land Apopka Expressway (Toll 414) opened on May 15, 2009, relieving some of US 441's traffic, taking the route from what is now the US 441 junction with SR 429, and then passing south of the city to rejoin US 441 at its junction with Maitland Boulevard South of the city.

Expansion of the expressway, including an extension of Toll 414, known as Wekiva Parkway, created a junction at US 441 and Plymouth Sorrento Road. Master plans take the Wekiva Parkway extension further north and then east connecting to Interstate 4 at Sanford. The expansion is scheduled to be completed by 2023. It will then be the shortest route from I-4 to the Disney attractions.

== Geography ==
Apopka is about 16 miles northwest of Downtown Orlando.

According to the United States Census Bureau, the city has a total area of 32.6 square miles (84.4 km^{2}). 31.2 square miles (80.9 km^{2}) of it is land and 1.4 square miles (3.5 km^{2}) of it (4.15%) is water.

=== Climate ===
The climate in this area is characterized by hot, humid summers and generally mild winters. According to the Köppen climate classification, the City of Apopka has a humid subtropical climate zone (Cfa).

Climate data for Plymouth 3N, 2002–2015 normals, extremes 2002–present
Month	Jan	Feb	Mar	Apr	May	Jun	Jul	Aug	Sep	Oct	Nov	Dec	Year
Record high °F (°C)	86 (30)	88 (31)	92 (33)	96 (36)	98 (37)	100 (38)	98 (37)	99 (37)	97 (36)	96 (36)	91 (33)	87 (31)	100 (38)
Mean daily maximum °F (°C)	70.2 (21.2)	72.1 (22.3)	78.5 (25.8)	83.4 (28.6)	88.6 (31.4)	90.9 (32.7)	92.0 (33.3)	92.2 (33.4)	89.8 (32.1)	84.8 (29.3)	76.9 (24.9)	72.0 (22.2)	82.6 (28.1)
Mean daily minimum °F (°C)	41.8 (5.4)	44.3 (6.8)	50.0 (10.0)	54.8 (12.7)	62.5 (16.9)	69.6 (20.9)	71.7 (22.1)	72.3 (22.4)	69.5 (20.8)	60.9 (16.1)	51.1 (10.6)	45.4 (7.4)	57.8 (14.3)
Record low °F (°C)	16 (−9)	19 (−7)	26 (−3)	30 (−1)	45 (7)	57 (14)	65 (18)	63 (17)	54 (12)	32 (0)	28 (−2)	15 (−9)	15 (−9)
Average precipitation inches (mm)	2.51 (64)	2.56 (65)	3.01 (76)	3.02 (77)	4.03 (102)	7.95 (202)	7.15 (182)	8.36 (212)	4.75 (121)	2.80 (71)	1.47 (37)	2.71 (69)	50.32 (1,278)
Average rainy days (≥ 0.01 in)	7.2	6.9	6.9	5.1	7.8	16.0	16.5	17.8	11.9	7.3	4.5	7.0	114.9
Source: NOAA

== Demographics ==
Historical population
Census	Pop.	Note	%±
1890	490		—
1900	218		−55.5%
1910	410		88.1%
1920	798		94.6%
1930	1,134		42.1%
1940	1,312		15.7%
1950	2,254		71.8%
1960	3,578		58.7%
1970	4,045		13.1%
1980	6,019		48.8%
1990	13,512		124.5%
2000	26,642		97.2%
2010	41,542		55.9%
2020	54,873		32.1%
2025 (est.)	65,552		19.5%
U.S. Decennial Census

=== Racial and ethnic composition ===
Apopka racial composition (Hispanics excluded from racial categories) (NH = Non-Hispanic)
Race	Pop 2010	Pop 2020	% 2010	% 2020
White (NH)	20,553	20,860	49.48%	38.02%
Black or African American (NH)	8,147	13,615	19.61%	24.81%
Native American or Alaska Native (NH)	69	86	0.17%	0.16%
Asian (NH)	1,309	1,666	3.15%	3.04%
Pacific Islander or Native Hawaiian (NH)	19	28	0.05%	0.05%
Some other race (NH)	147	456	0.35%	0.83%
Two or more races/Multiracial (NH)	750	2,191	1.81%	3.99%
Hispanic or Latino (any race)	10,548	15,971	25.39%	29.11%
Total	41,542	54,873		

=== 2020 census ===
As of the 2020 census, Apopka had a population of 54,873. The median age was 37.5 years. 25.3% of residents were under the age of 18 and 13.0% of residents were 65 years of age or older. For every 100 females there were 92.4 males, and for every 100 females age 18 and over there were 88.8 males age 18 and over.

98.8% of residents lived in urban areas, while 1.2% lived in rural areas.

There were 18,371 households in Apopka, of which 40.6% had children under the age of 18 living in them. Of all households, 55.8% were married-couple households, 13.1% were households with a male householder and no spouse or partner present, and 24.4% were households with a female householder and no spouse or partner present. About 16.6% of all households were made up of individuals and 6.5% had someone living alone who was 65 years of age or older.

There were 19,425 housing units, of which 5.4% were vacant. The homeowner vacancy rate was 2.5% and the rental vacancy rate was 5.4%.

Racial composition as of the 2020 census
Race	Number	Percent
White	23,980	43.7%
Black or African American	14,144	25.8%
American Indian and Alaska Native	297	0.5%
Asian	1,708	3.1%
Native Hawaiian and Other Pacific Islander	35	0.1%
Some other race	6,101	11.1%
Two or more races	8,608	15.7%
Hispanic or Latino (of any race)	15,971	29.1%

=== 2010 census ===
As of the 2010 United States census, there were 41,542 people, 14,739 households, and 10,648 families residing in the city.

=== 2000 census ===
As of the census of 2000, there were 26,642 people, 9,562 households, and 7,171 families residing in the city. The population density was 1,108.1 inhabitants per square mile (427.8/km^{2}). There were 10,091 housing units at an average density of 419.7 per square mile (162.0/km^{2}). The racial makeup of the city was 73.85% White, 15.56% African American, 0.42% Native American, 1.89% Asian, 0.09% Pacific Islander, 5.36% from other races, and 2.83% from two or more races. Hispanic or Latino of any race were 18.08% of the population.

In 2000, there were 9,562 households, out of which 38.2% had children under the age of 18 living with them, 55.8% were married couples living together, 14.4% had a female householder with no husband present, and 25.0% were non-families. 18.6% of all households were made up of individuals, and 5.8% had someone living alone who was 65 years of age or older. The average household size was 2.76 and the average family size was 3.13.

In 2000, in the city the population was spread out, with 28.2% under the age of 18, 8.6% from 18 to 24, 33.6% from 25 to 44, 19.5% from 45 to 64, and 10.1% who were 65 years of age or older. The median age was 33 years. For every 100 females, there were 94.0 males. For every 100 females age 18 and over, there were 90.1 males.

In 2000, the median income for a household in the city was $43,651, and the median income for a family was $49,380. Males had a median income of $32,177 versus $26,553 for females. The per capita income for the city was $19,189. About 7.1% of families and 9.5% of the population were below the poverty line, including 12.6% of those under age 18 and 9.7% of those age 65 or over.

== Education ==
- Forest Lake Academy, a Seventh-day Adventist high school.
- Apopka is served by Orange County Public Schools with two high schools: Apopka High School and Wekiva High School.
- University of Florida's Institute of Food and Agricultural Sciences Mid-Florida Research and Education Center is located in Apopka.
- The Golf Academy of America (Altamonte Campus), a 2-year golf college is located in Apopka.
- Christian Learning Academy is a private K–12 school offering varsity athletics, music programs, and Model United Nations.

== Healthcare ==
There are two hospitals in the city AdventHealth Apopka and Orlando Health Behavioral Hospital.

In 2026, HCA Florida built a free-standing emergency room on the westside of the city.

== Notable people ==
- John Anderson, country singer
- Steve Baylark, NFL running back
- Rogers Beckett Jr., former NFL safety for the San Diego Chargers and the Cincinnati Bengals
- Joel Berry II, basketball player for the University of North Carolina
- Richard Borg, board game designer
- Sawyer Brown, country music band founded in Apopka
- Jonathan Cain, member of multi mega hit rock group Journey, multi-instrumentist and songwriter
- Jalen Carter, Philadelphia Eagles Defensive Tackle
- Joe Chealey, Basketball Player
- Alan Gendreau, football placekicker at Middle Tennessee State
- Ray Goolsby baseball outfielder for the Washington Senators
- Renardo Green, Cornerback for the San Francisco 49ers.
- Zack Greinke, Baseball All-Star (2009, 2014)
- Michael Halliday, defender
- Glenn Hubbard, dean, Columbia University Graduate School of Business
- John H. Land, longest serving full-time city mayor
- Michael Larson, Press Your Luck Scandal winner of $110,237 in 1984
- Jerry Lawson, lead singer of The Persuasions
- Brad Linaweaver, science fiction writer, film producer and screenwriter, magazine publisher
- Christy Martin, American world champion boxer, resided in Apopka for many years
- Justin McGrath, professional Super Smash Bros. Melee player
- Brandon Meriweather, former NFL defensive back
- Bryan Richey, member of the Tennessee House of Representatives
- Fireball Roberts, race car driver
- Mattie Rogers, Olympic Weightlifter
- Warren Sapp, All-Pro NFL defensive lineman
- Sammie Smith, former NFL running back for the Miami Dolphins and the Denver Broncos
- Monty Sopp, professional wrestler, former WWF/E
- Scott Stapp, member of multi mega hit rock group Creed, singer and songwriter grew up in Apopka
- Wayne Taylor, owner, Wayne Taylor Racing; winner of 1996 and 2005 24 Hours of Daytona, 2005 Rolex Series
- Pat Travers, tours from, records, and resides in Apopka

== Apopka in art ==
=== Literature ===
Apopka is referenced in Zora Neale Hurston's famous novel, Their Eyes Were Watching God.

Apopka is referenced in Eddie C. Brown's autobiographical book, Beating the Odds: Eddie Brown's Investing and Life Strategies.

History of the greater Apopka and Central Florida area is detailed in William Gladden, Jr's book, The Pennings of Perrine Slim: Stories of Northwest Orange County Florida. Included are 100 pictures of the area, most by Dr Phyllis Olmstead. Olmstead Publishing.

History of Apopka and Northwest Orange County, Florida by Jerrell H Shofner, (1982). Rose Printing. Apopka Historical Society.

Tales of the Big Potato by Jack Christmas (2011). New Book Publishing. Reprint Olmstead Publishing.

Apopka: Images of America photos of the Apopka area, (2004). Apopka Historical Society.

=== Film ===
Apopka takes place in and is prominently featured in Johannes Grenzfurthner's horror drama Masking Threshold that premiered at Fantastic Fest in 2021.

Apopka is referenced in Ernest Saves Christmas on Ernest's truck "Apopka Snake Ranch".
