= Ryan & Company Lumber Yard =

- U.S. National Register of Historic Places
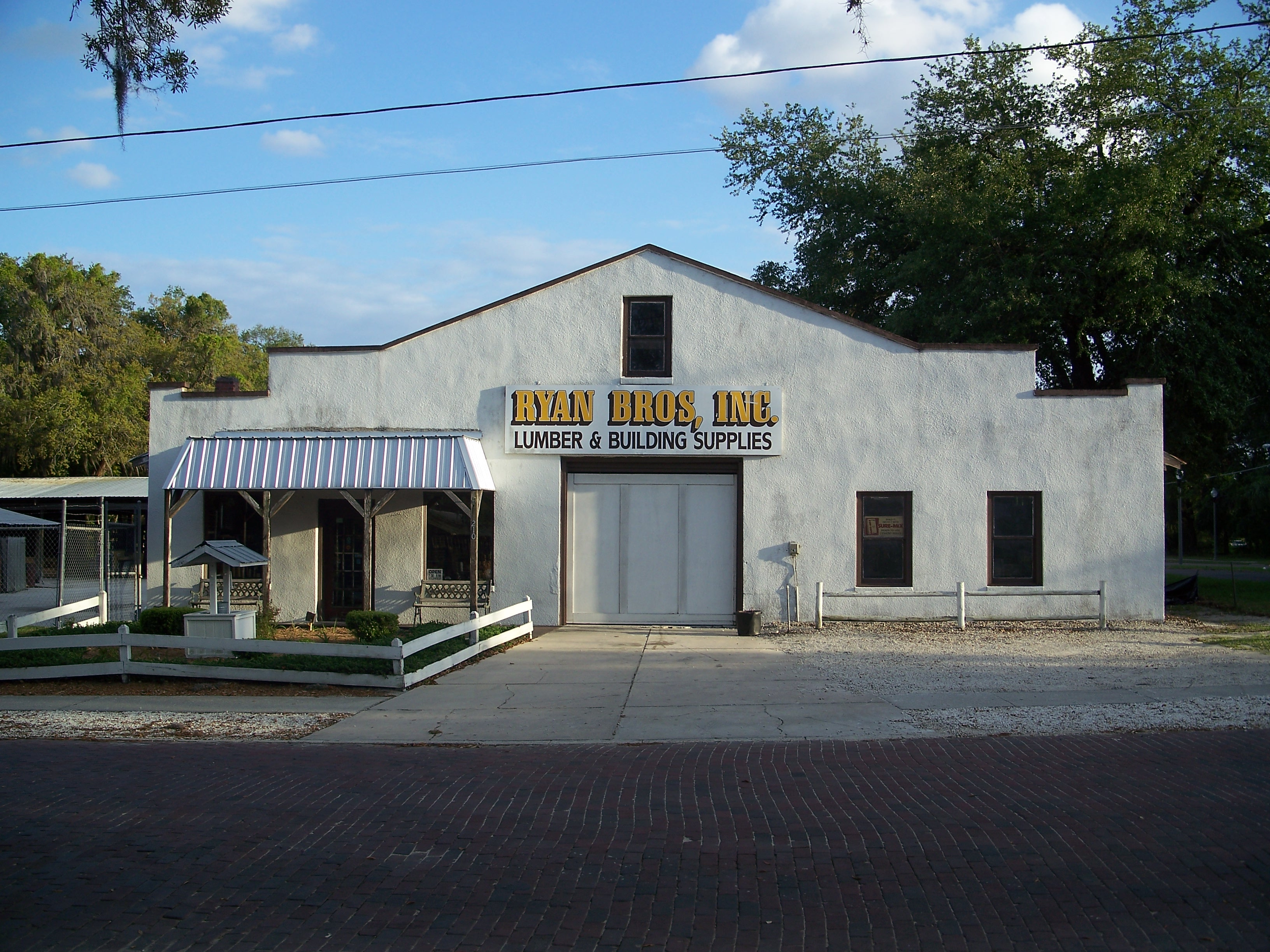

- Location within Florida Location within the United States
- Location: Apopka, Florida
- Coordinates: 28°40′18″N 81°30′27″W
- NRHP reference No.: 93000074
- Added to NRHP: February 25, 1993

The Ryan & Company Lumber Yard (also known as Ryan Bros., Inc.) is a historic site in Apopka, Florida. It is located at 215 East Fifth Street. On February 25, 1993, it was added to the U.S. National Register of Historic Places.
