= Mitchell–Tibbetts House =

Historic house in Florida, United States

- U.S. National Register of Historic Places
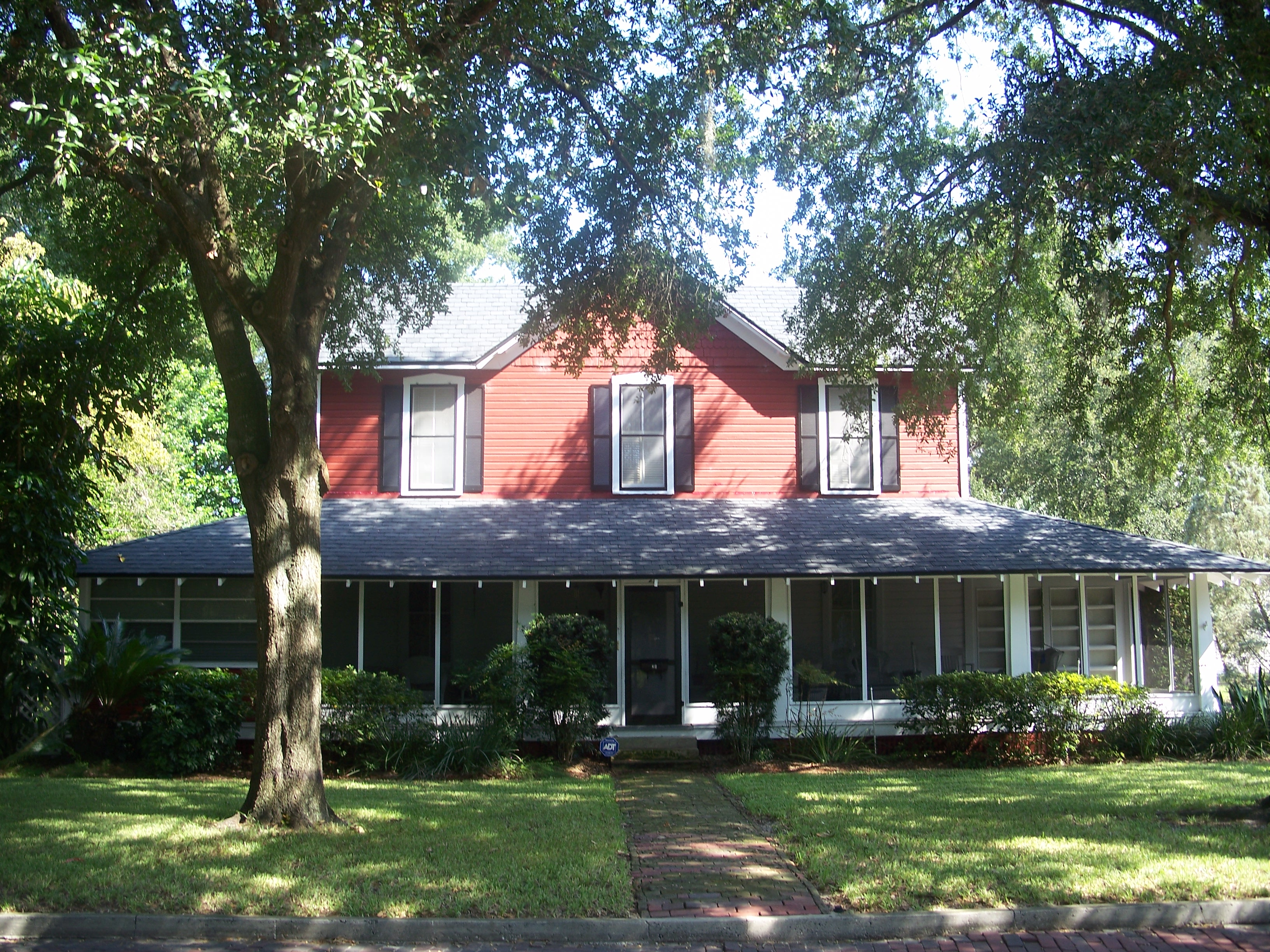

- Location within Florida Location within the United States
- Location: Apopka, Florida
- Coordinates: 28°40′40″N 81°30′40″W
- Built: 1887
- NRHP reference No.: 91001661
- Added to NRHP: November 7, 1991

The Mitchell–Tibbetts House (also known as the Miner House) is a historic home in Apopka, Florida. It is located at 21 East Orange Street. On November 7, 1991, it was added to the U.S. National Register of Historic Places.

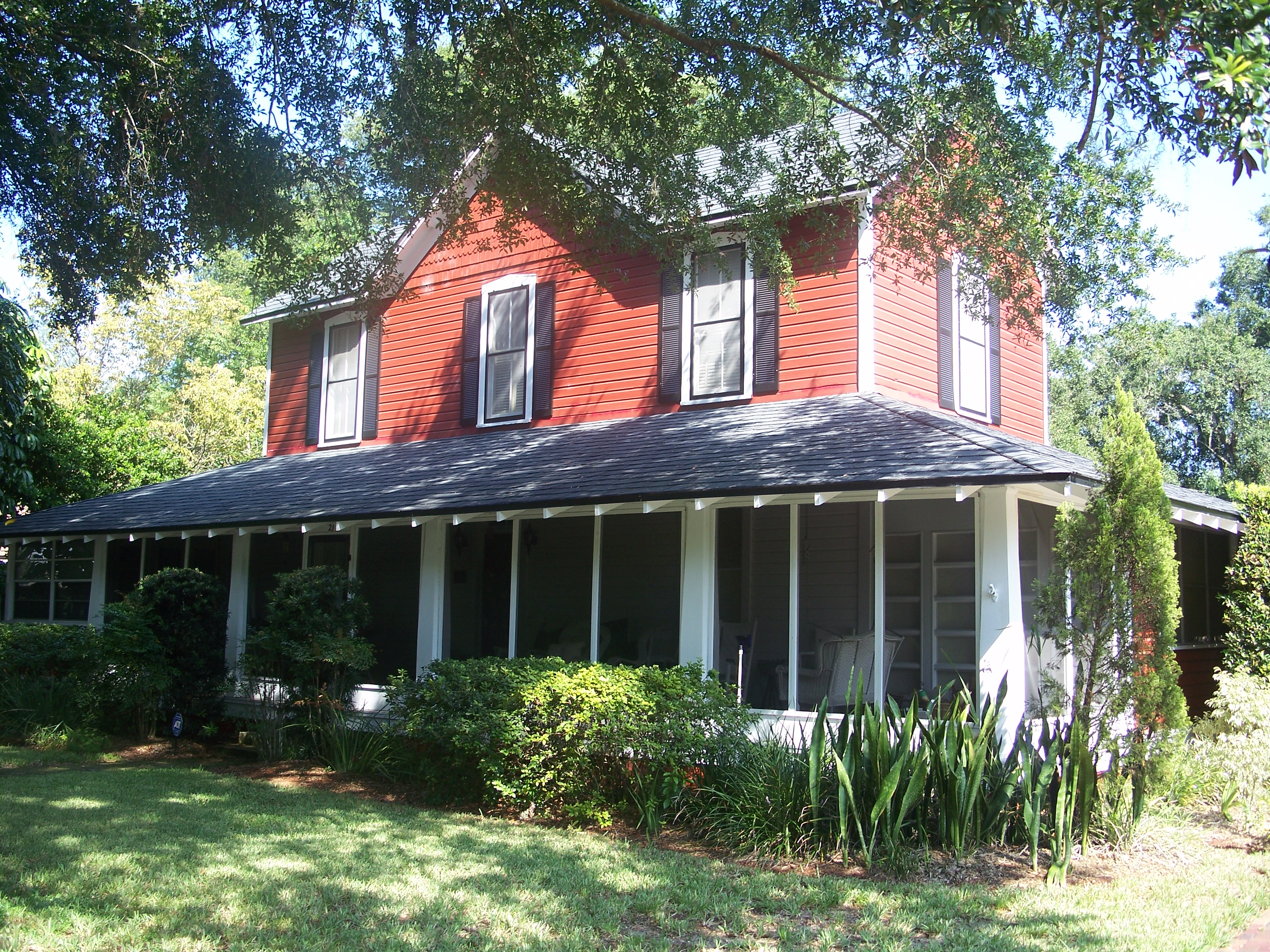

The house was built for R.N. Mitchell, a pioneer in the Apopka area. It was later owned by George W. Tibbetts, a general in the Union Army.
