= Mungan syndrome =

- Specialty: Gastroenterology

Mungan syndrome was first described in 2003 by Z. Mungan et al. as an autosomal recessively inherited disorder in a Turkish family. It is characterized by mainly gastrointestinal hypomotility related to visceral neuromyopathy which cause chronic intestinal pseudo-obstruction (CIIP). CIIP is a rare and severe clinical syndrome characterized by symptoms and signs of intestinal occlusion, in the absence of any mechanical obstruction. Family members of this syndrome had also megaduodenum, Barrett's esophagus, different cardiac abnormalities and some other organ involvement. In 2007, Deglincerti A et al. studied genetic abnormalities in this family members and identified a new syndromic locus on chromosome 8q23-q24.
