= Waite-Davis House =

Historic house in Florida, United States

- U.S. National Register of Historic Places
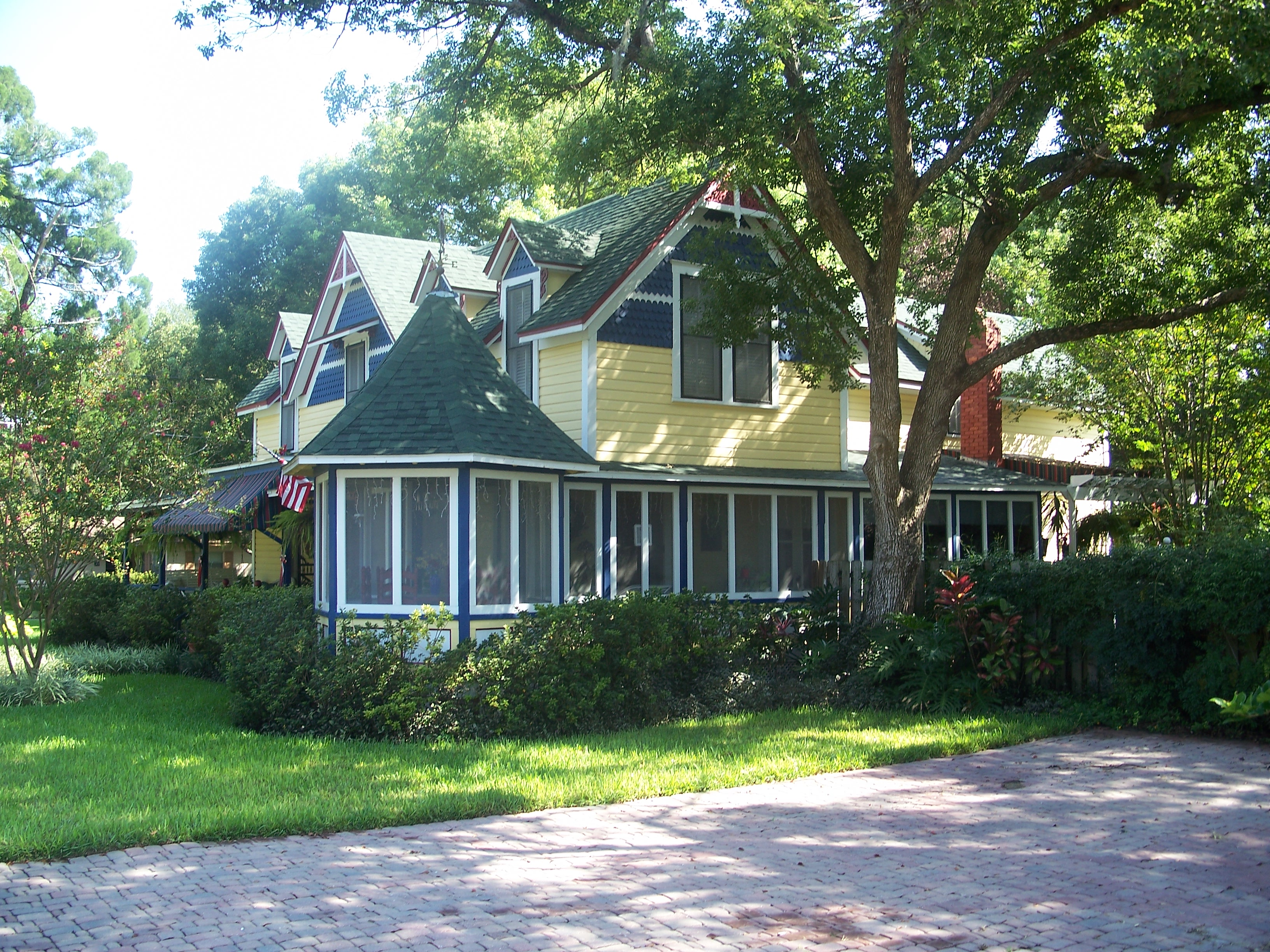

- Location within Florida Location within the United States
- Location: Apopka, Florida
- Coordinates: 28°40′39″N 81°30′41″W
- Built: 1886
- NRHP reference No.: 90001127
- Added to NRHP: August 2, 1990

The Waite-Davis House (also known as the Leslie P. Waite House) is a historic home in Apopka, Florida. It is located at 5 South Central Avenue. On August 2, 1990, it was added to the U.S. National Register of Historic Places.

== Gallery ==
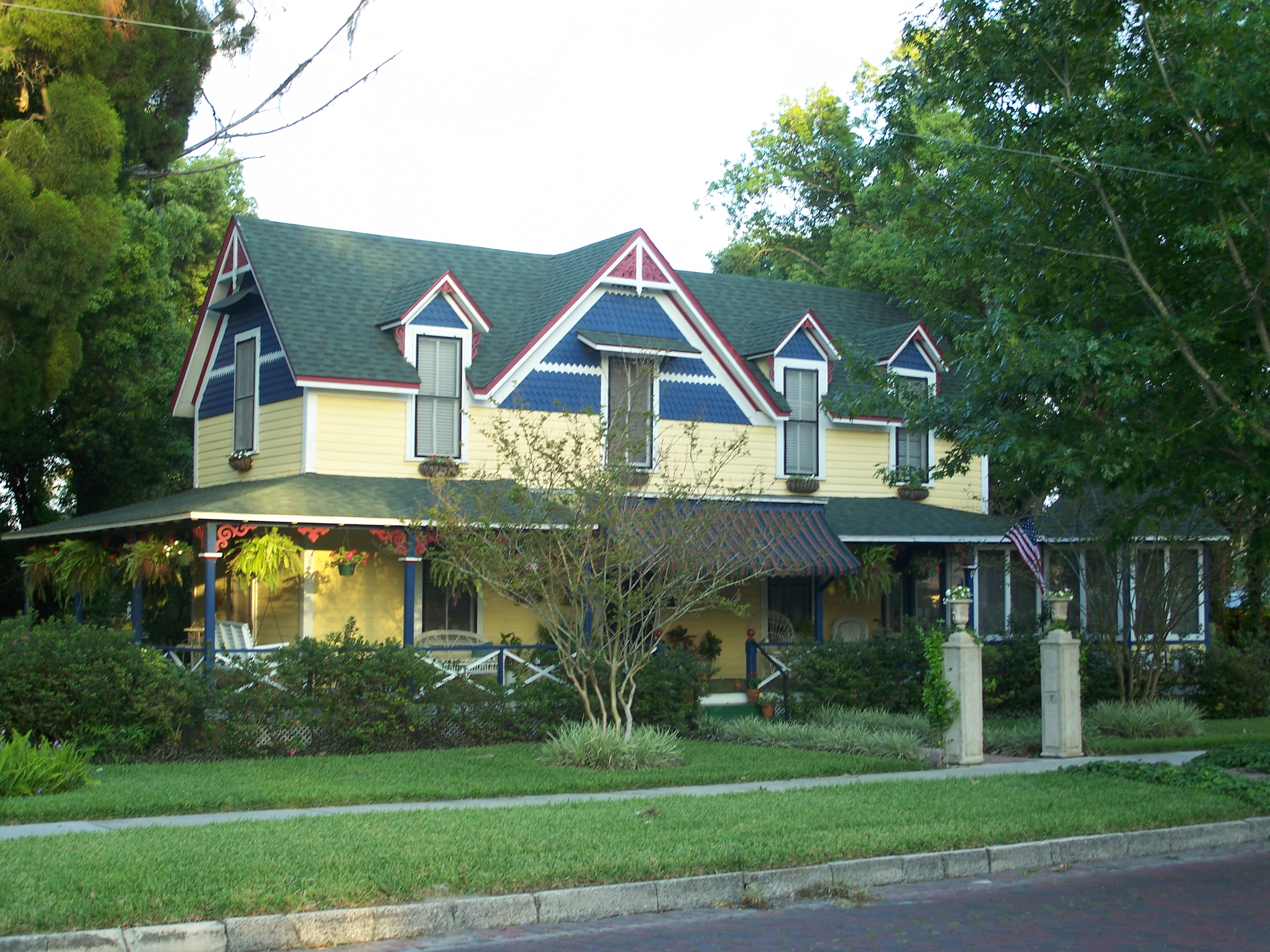

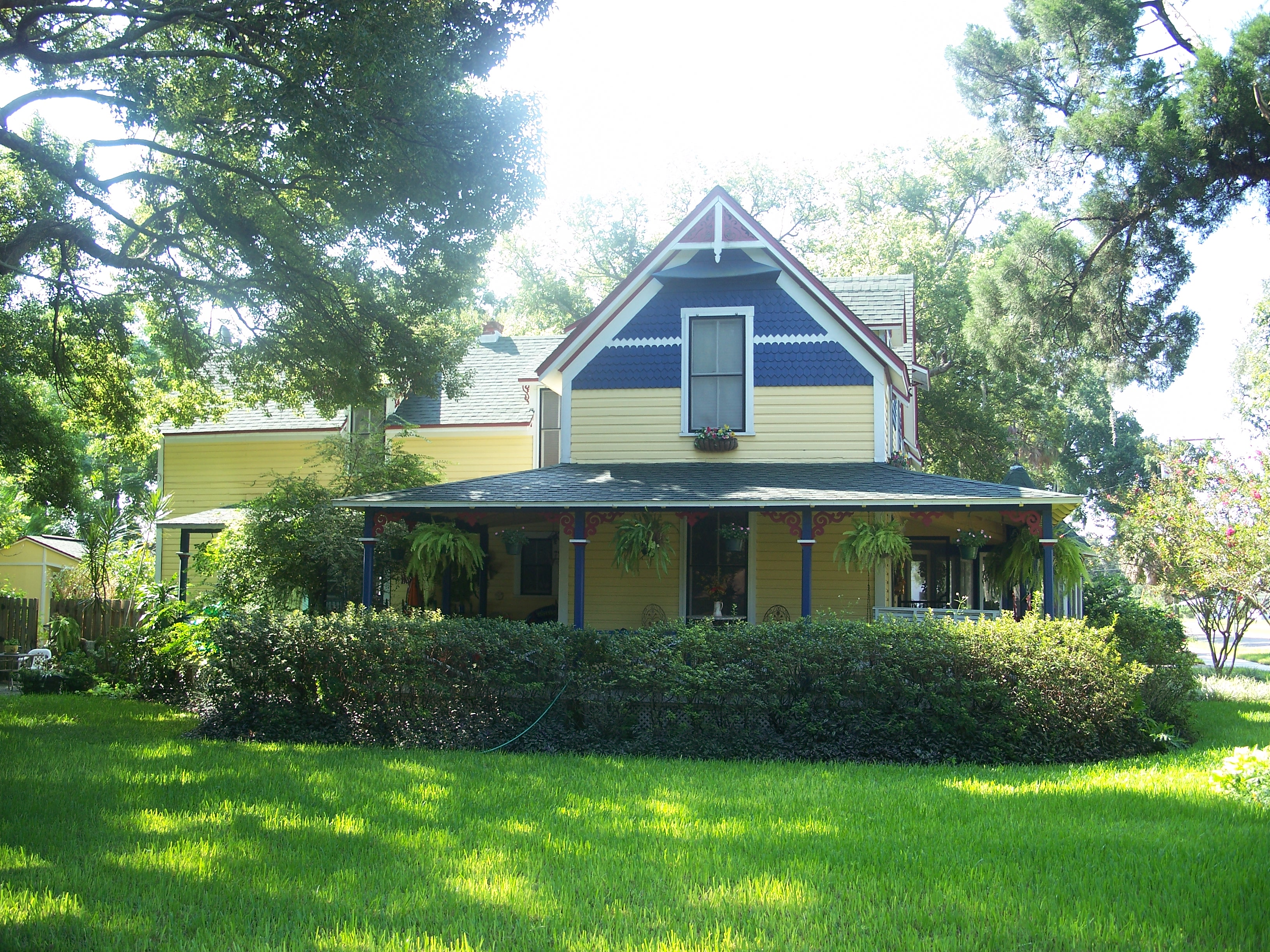

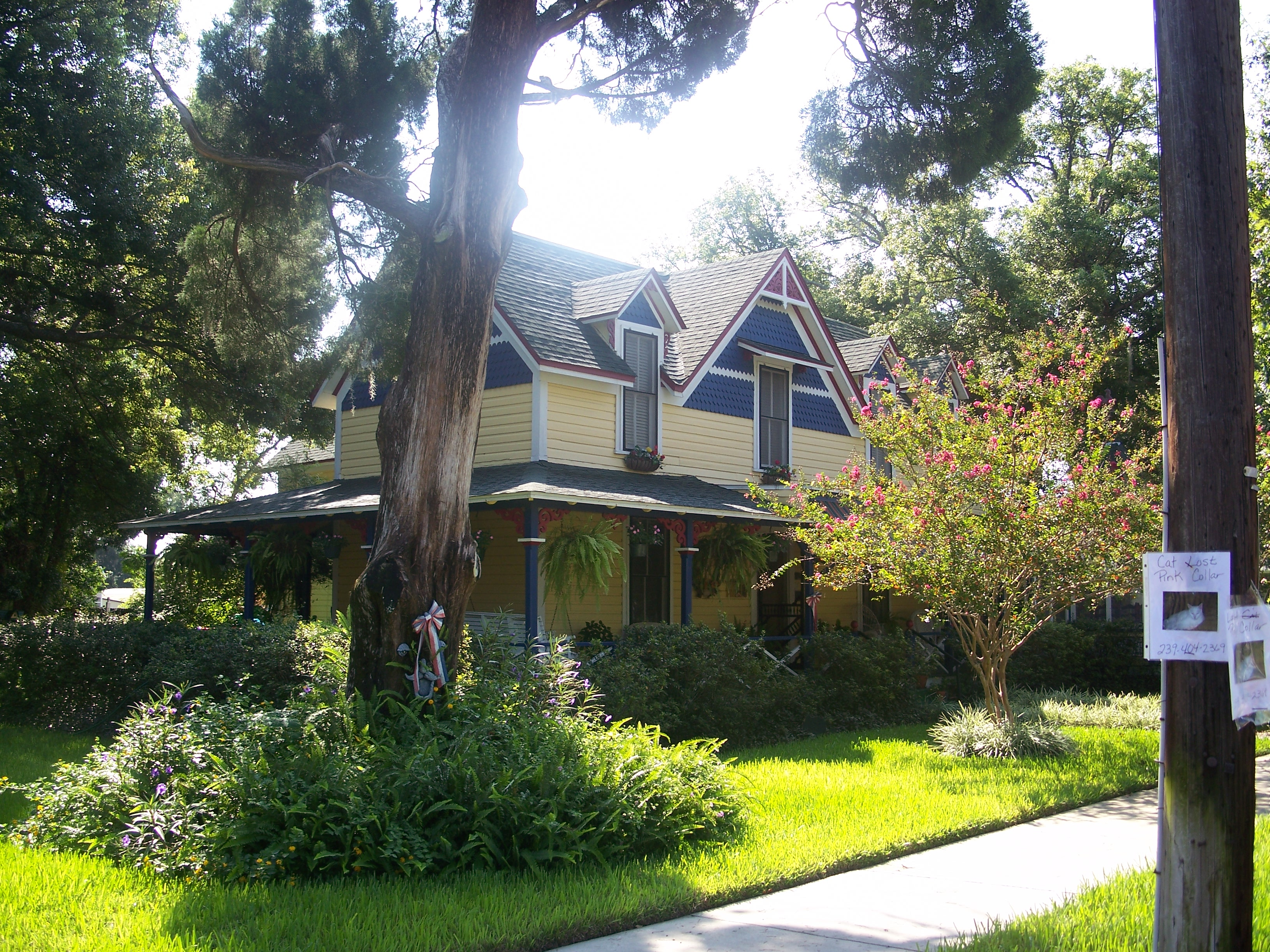

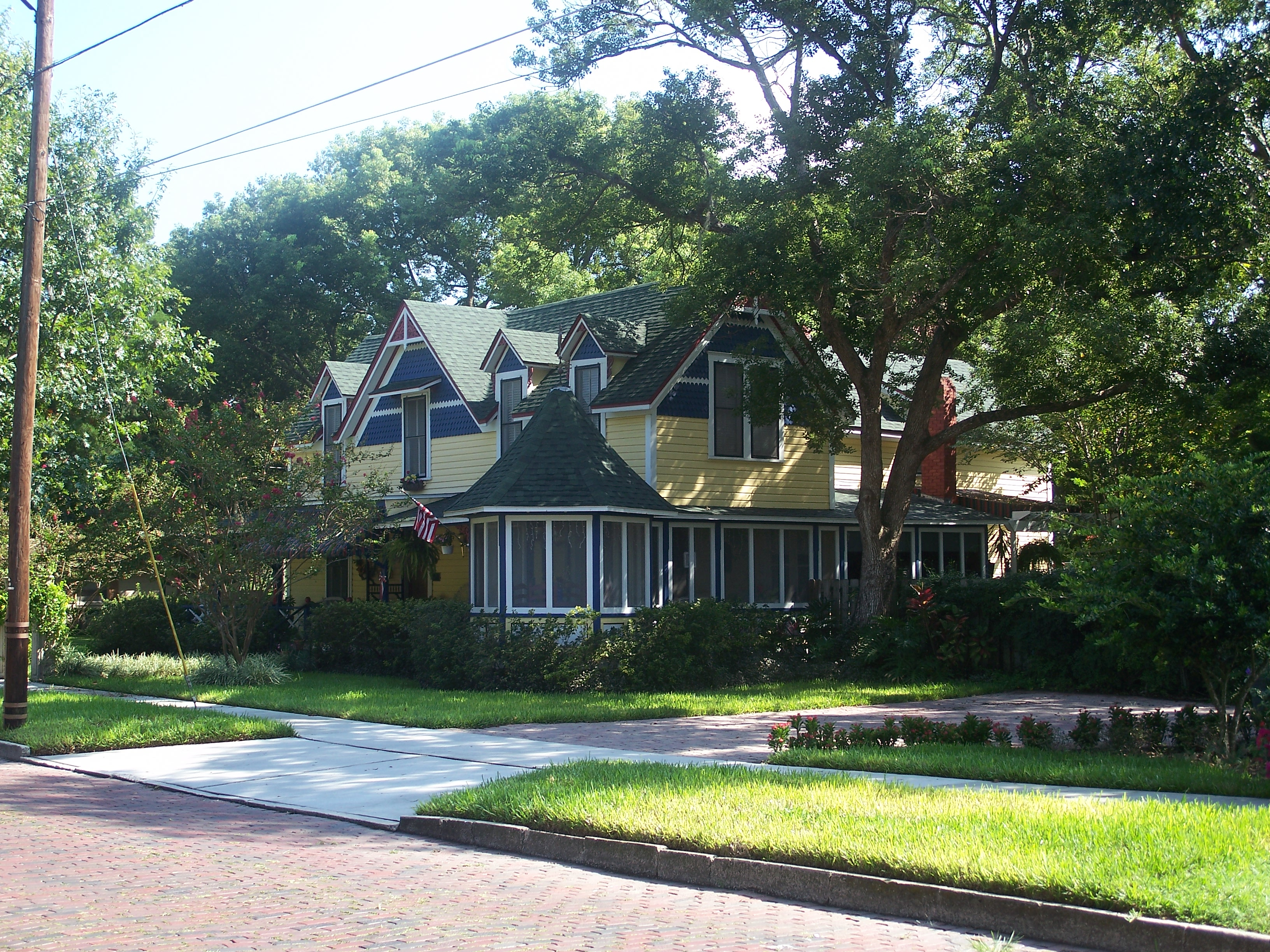
