= Apopka station =

- Apopka Seaboard Air Line Railway Depot
- U.S. National Register of Historic Places
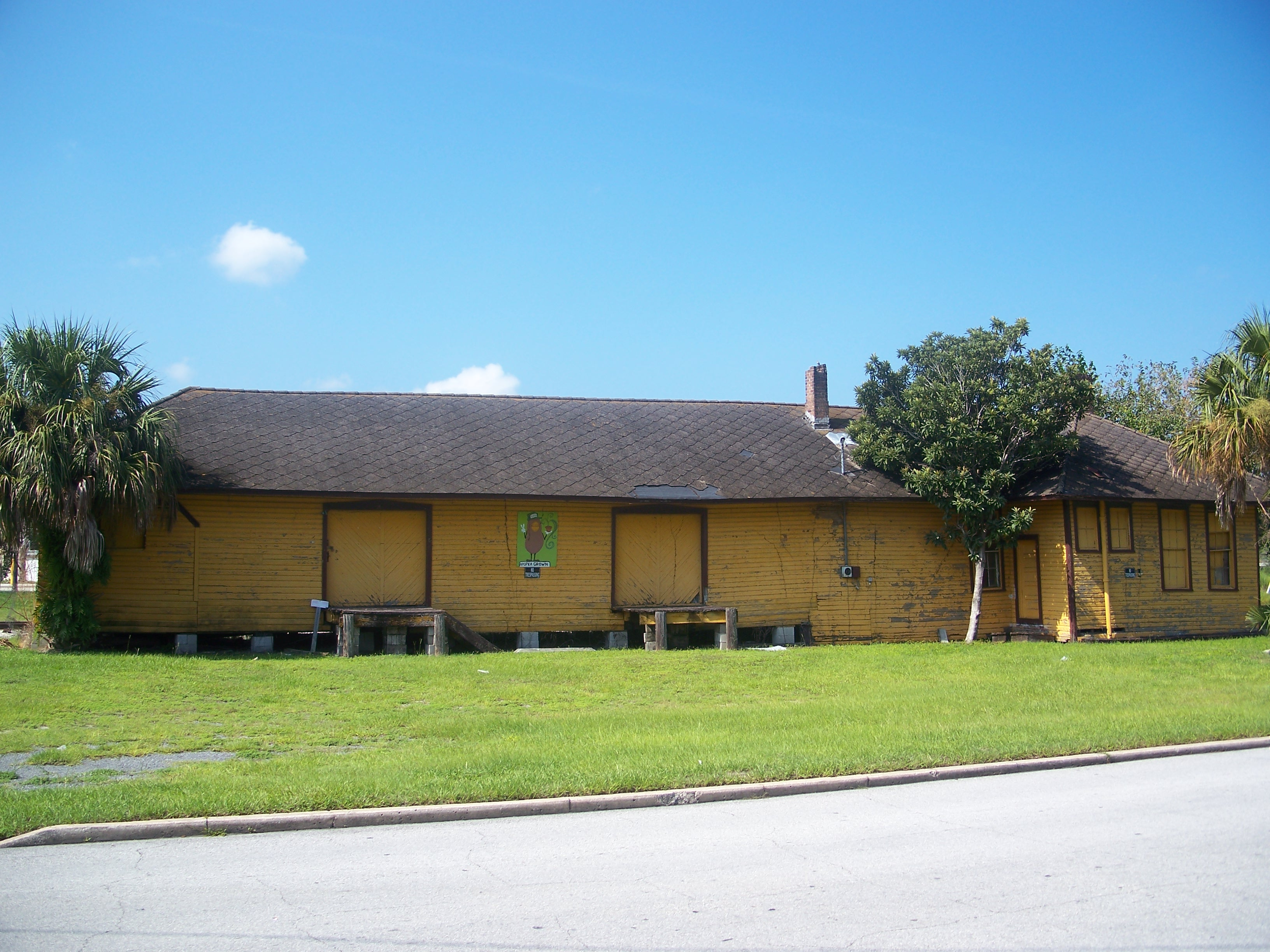

- Location within Florida Location within the United States
- Location: Apopka, Florida
- Coordinates: 28°40′14″N 81°30′38″W
- Built: 1918
- NRHP reference No.: 93000134
- Added to NRHP: March 15, 1993

The Apopka Seaboard Air Line Railway Depot is a historic Seaboard Air Line Railroad depot in Apopka, Florida, United States. It is located at 36 East Station Street. The station was built in 1918 to serve a line originally used by the Tavares, Orlando, and Atlantic Railroad in 1885. On March 15, 1993, it was added to the U.S. National Register of Historic Places. In 2010, a proposal was made to relocate the depot.

Preceding station	Seaboard Air Line Railroad	Following station
Tavares toward Wildwood	Orlando Subdivision	Orlando toward Lake Charm
