= Apopka Police Department =

Police department for Apopka, Florida

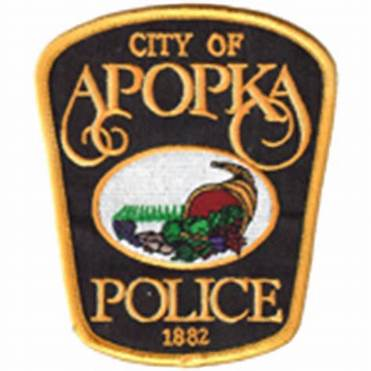
- Patch

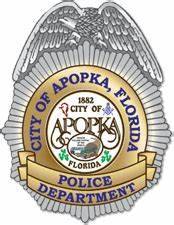
- Badge
- Abbreviation: APD

Agency overview
- Formed: 1882
- Annual budget: US$23.6 million (2023)

Jurisdictional structure
- Operations jurisdiction: Apopka, Florida, United States
- Map of Apopka Police Department's jurisdiction
- Area: 35.97 square miles (93.2 km^{2})
- Population: 55,072
- Legal jurisdiction: Apopka, Florida
- General nature: Local civilian police

Operational structure
- Police officers: 132 (2024)
- Civilians: 39
- Agency executive: Michael McKinley, Police Chief

Website
- https://apopka.gov/545/Welcome

The Apopka Police Department (APD) is the law enforcement agency for the City of Apopka, Florida. It has 150 sworn officers. The APD has jurisdiction over incorporated parts of the city. Unincorporated parts of the city are served by the Orange County Sheriff's Department. In 2023, the Police Department was allocated US$23.6 million.

The department handles municipal law enforcement and is dispatched to both emergency and non-emergency calls within city limits. The APD also handles code enforcement and cyber safety.

The department has a SWAT team and has an armored vehicle nicknamed Goliath. The APD's SWAT team is part of the Central Florida Metro SWAT, comprising the Apopka Police Department, Winter Park Police Department, Maitand Police, Winter Garden Police Department, and Ocoee Police Department.

Since February 2023, the APD has had a Citizen's Police Academy. Graduates of the 14-week course are part of the Apopka Citizens Police Academy Alumni Association (ACPAAA). The goal of the ACPAAA is to support the mission of the APD and serve as volunteers.

== History ==
Before the establishment of the Apopka Police Department policing services were provided by the Orange County Sheriff and various appointed constables in the early 1900s. As the city has grown the department is now responsible policing over 30 miles.

=== Misconduct ===
The police department has been noted for a few controversies. In November 2021, a lawsuit was filed against the department for alleged use of excessive force. In May 2022, an APD officer was arrested in connection with the January 6 United States Capitol attack. It was reported that the officer was part of the Proud Boys, a neo-fascist organization. In July 2022, an APD officer was charged with a DUI while being nearly 5 times over the legal limit. The department assisted in the arrest and charging of the officer involved.
