= John H. Land =

John Land
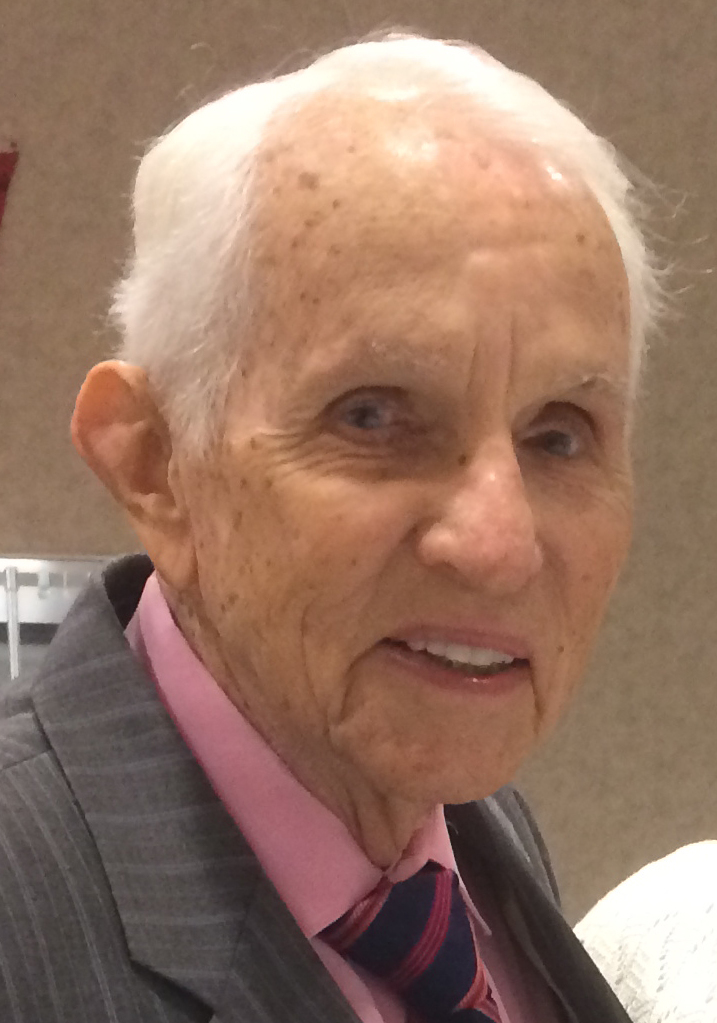
- Land announcing his 2013 campaign for mayor

Mayor of Apopka, Florida
- In office January 1, 1971 – April 22, 2014
- Preceded by: Leonard Hurst
- Succeeded by: Joe Kilsheimer
- In office January 1, 1950 – January 1, 1968
- Preceded by: Dr. C. H. Damsel
- Succeeded by: Leonard Hurst

Personal details
- Born: November 5, 1920 Plant City, Florida, U.S.
- Died: November 22, 2014 (aged 94) Orlando, Florida, U.S.
- Party: Republican
- Spouse: Betty Hall Land
- Profession: politician

John Horting Land (November 5, 1920 – November 22, 2014) was Mayor of Apopka, Florida for a total of 61 years, from 1950 to 1968 and again from 1971 to 2014. He was the longest-serving mayor in the history of Florida and one of the longest-serving mayors in the United States. After having served continuously since 1971, Land was defeated in a bid for re-election by Joe Kilsheimer on April 8, 2014.

== Background ==
He was born in Plant City in 1920, and he moved to Apopka at a very young age.

He attended the University of Florida until enlisting to fight in World War II in April 1942. He served in the United States Army and was present at the liberation of Dachau concentration camp in Germany in 1945. After his unit was returned home at the end of the war, he remained in Europe to work the train transportation area during the Nuremberg Trials. He was promoted to captain. He received an honorary Bachelor of Fine Arts degree dated 1942 from the School of Forest Resources and Conservations in the college of Agriculture from University of Florida upon his return. After the war he had a career in crate manufacturing (or wire-bound box) and bulk oil plant.

== Career ==
Land was first elected as Mayor of Apopka, Florida in 1949 (inaugurated January 1, 1950) and served in this capacity until 1968. In 1970 he was once again elected as mayor, serving until 2014. In January 2014 Land celebrated his 61st year as mayor. In addition, he also served on the Florida League of Cities board of directors. On March 8, 2011, Land was recognized by both the Florida House of Representatives and Senate as the longest-serving mayor in Florida and the longest-serving full-time mayor in the United States.

On April 8, 2014, Land lost his bid for re-election to Joe Kilsheimer.

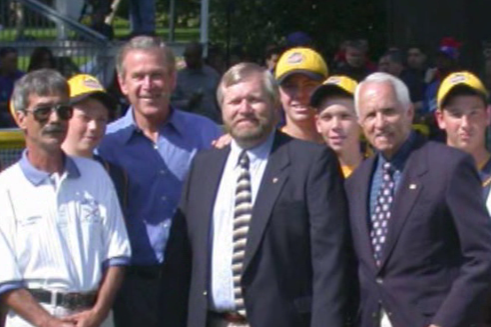
John Land and President George W. Bush at the White House in May 2002.

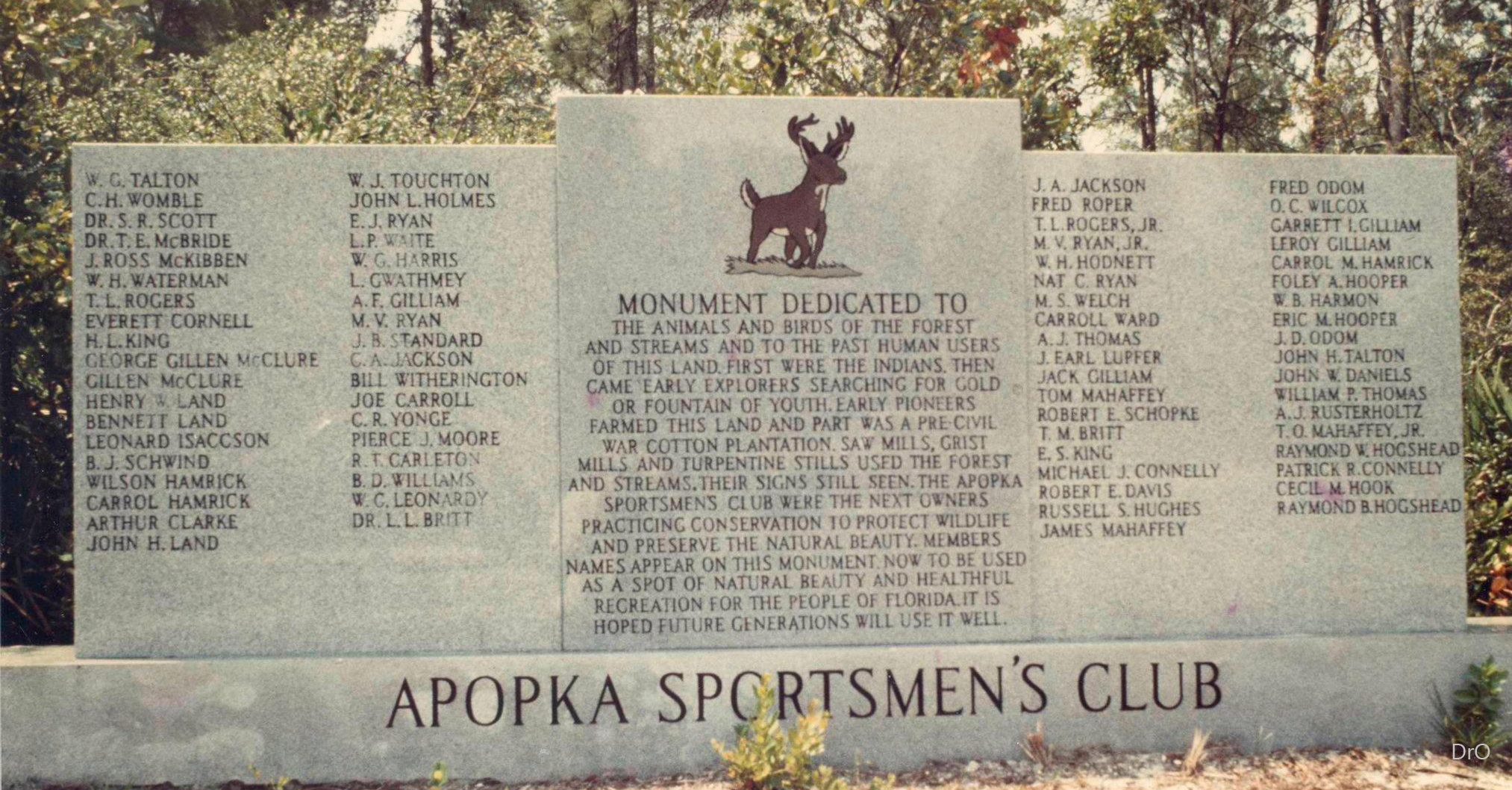
The monument in Wekiwa Springs State Park honoring the 50 deed holders of the Apopka Sportsmen's Club for Preserving the Park

Land was a president of the Rotary Club of Apopka, a Paul P. Harris Fellow, sustaining member of Rotary International, having joined on April 24, 1949.

== Death ==
On November 21, 2014, two and a half weeks after turning 94, Land suffered a massive stroke and died in a hospital in Orlando, Florida the following day. He was visited by hundreds of citizens as he lie in state in City Hall and then taken by Loomis Funeral Homes, an Apopkan funeral home, to the Apopka Community Center for a formal funeral service. He was placed in a horse-drawn caisson, and emergency services blasted three times as the horse briefly stopped in front of the building he first attended school in, then after it was remodeled into a city hall, and then ran all but five meetings of 61 years as mayor. The caisson arrived at Edgewood-Greenwood Cemetery, where the police and emergency services, and a United States Army honor guard, were at attention.

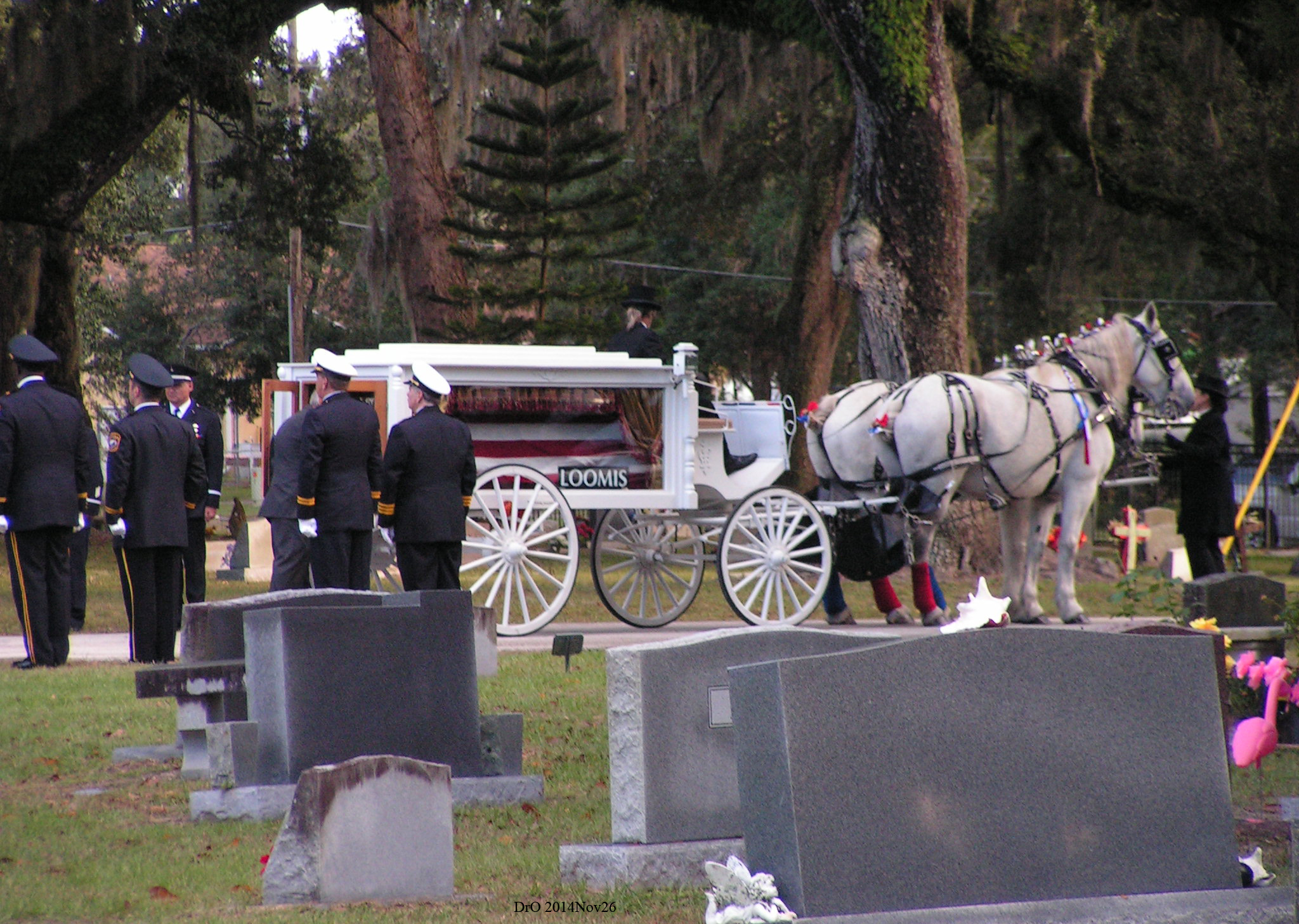
John H. Land received a full military honors funeral and was carried through the City of Apopka in a horse-drawn caisson by Loomis Funerals Homes.
