= Acid peptic diseases =

Diseases of the stomach and gastrointestinal tract

- Specialty: Gastroenterology

Acid peptic diseases, such as peptic ulcers, Zollinger-Ellison syndrome, and gastroesophageal reflux disease, are caused by distinct but overlapping pathogenic mechanisms involving acid effects on mucosal defense. Acid reflux damages the esophageal mucosa and may also cause laryngeal tissue injury, leading to the development of pulmonary symptoms.

The pharmacologic treatment of acid peptic disorders centers on redressing this imbalance by either improving mucosal defenses with drugs like sucralfate, bismuth, and prostaglandin analogs, neutralizing acid with antacids, or decreasing acid secretion with histamine 2 receptor antagonists or, more recently, proton pump inhibitors.

== Causes ==
Mucosal disruption in acid peptic disease patients can be caused by infection, barrier disruption, or gastric acid hypersecretion. Acid peptic diseases can arise due to various risk factors such as Helicobacter pylori infection, alcoholism, tobacco use, cocaine and amphetamine use, nonsteroidal anti-inflammatory drug use (NSAIDs), fasting, Zollinger-Ellison syndrome, angiogenesis inhibitor-treated cancer, and bariatric surgery.

== Diagnosis ==
=== Peptic ulcer disease ===
Peptic ulcer disease (PUD) is a break in the inner lining of the stomach, the first part of the small intestine, or sometimes the lower esophagus. An ulcer in the stomach is called a gastric ulcer, while one in the first part of the intestines is a duodenal ulcer. The most common symptoms of a duodenal ulcer are waking at night with upper abdominal pain, and upper abdominal pain that improves with eating. With a gastric ulcer, the pain may worsen with eating. The pain is often described as a burning or dull ache. Other symptoms include belching, vomiting, weight loss, or poor appetite. About a third of older people have no symptoms. Complications may include bleeding, perforation, and blockage of the stomach.Bleeding occurs in as many as 15% of cases.

=== Gastroesophageal reflux disease ===
Gastroesophageal reflux disease is one of the upper gastrointestinal chronic diseases in which stomach content persistently and regularly flows up into the esophagus, resulting in symptoms and/or complications. Symptoms include dental corrosion, dysphagia, heartburn, odynophagia, regurgitation, non-cardiac chest pain, extraesophageal symptoms such as chronic cough, hoarseness, reflux-induced laryngitis, or asthma. In the long term, and when not treated, complications such as esophagitis, esophageal stricture, and Barrett's esophagus may arise.

=== Zollinger–Ellison syndrome ===
Zollinger-Ellison syndrome (ZES) is caused by a gastrinoma, which is a gastrin-producing tumor that causes gastric acid hypersecretion. The main clinical manifestations of ZES are peptic ulcers and diarrhea. The initial diagnostic test for ZES is a fasting serum gastrin level when antisecretory medications are stopped. If the gastrin level is high, the acidity of the stomach is measured using pH or gastric analysis. The secretin stimulation test may be useful in suspected cases of ZES with mild hypergastrinemia. ZES is initially treated with high-dose proton pump inhibitors taken orally. If parenteral therapy is required, an intermittent pantoprazole bolus injection is advised. Total gastrectomy and antisecretory surgery are uncommon.

== Treatment ==
Histamine 2 antagonists and PPIs have largely replaced antacids as the primary treatment for most acid-peptic disorders; however, they continue to play a role because they are inexpensive, widely available, and safe in the majority of populations. Antacids work almost instantly and are useful for quick relief of mild or sporadic symptoms. Antacids primarily affect the stomach by partially neutralizing gastric hydrochloric acid and inhibiting the proteolytic enzyme pepsin. Antacids that are commonly used contain sodium bicarbonate, calcium carbonate, magnesium hydroxide, and aluminum hydroxide. In 1972, functional antagonists to the H2 receptor emerged. This class of agents has since revolutionized the treatment of PUD, and its priority in the treatment of acid-related diseases has only been surpassed by the development of PPIs. Cimetidine, ranitidine, famotidine, and nizatidine are the four most commonly used H2-receptor antagonists (H2RAs). All of them have an effect on the H2 receptor. The H2RAs are reversible structural analogs of histamine that cause a reduction in the receptor's tonic activation rate, acting as inverse agonists with functional antagonism of histamine activity. Proton pump inhibitors are the most effective gastric acid secretion inhibitors. Orally available PPIs include five commonly used PPIs (omeprazole, esomeprazole, lansoprazole, pantoprazole, and rabeprazole) and the recently approved dexlansoprazole.

== See also ==
- Peptic ulcer disease
- Gastroesophageal reflux disease
- Zollinger–Ellison syndrome
