= Dexloxiglumide =

Chemical compound

Clinical data
- ATC code: none

Identifiers
- IUPAC name: (4R)-4-[(3,4-dichlorobenzoyl)amino]-5-(3-methoxypropylpentylamino)-5-oxopentanoic acid
- CAS Number: 119817-90-2
- PubChem CID: 65937
- IUPHAR/BPS: 889
- ChemSpider: 59342
- UNII: 69DY40RH9B
- ChEMBL: ChEMBL550781
- CompTox Dashboard (EPA): DTXSID50152604

Chemical and physical data
- Formula: C_{21}H_{30}Cl_{2}N_{2}O_{5}
- Molar mass: 461.38 g·mol^{−1}
- 3D model (JSmol): Interactive image
- SMILES: CCCCCN(CCCOC)C(=O)[C@@H](CCC(=O)O)NC(=O)C1=CC(=C(C=C1)Cl)Cl
- InChI: InChI=1S/C21H30Cl2N2O5/c1-3-4-5-11-25(12-6-13-30-2)21(29)18(9-10-19(26)27)24-20(28)15-7-8-16(22)17(23)14-15/h7-8,14,18H,3-6,9-13H2,1-2H3,(H,24,28)(H,26,27)/t18-/m1/s1; Key:QNQZBKQEIFTHFZ-GOSISDBHSA-N

Dexloxiglumide is a drug which acts as a cholecystokinin antagonist, selective for the CCK_{A} subtype. It inhibits gastrointestinal motility and reduces gastric secretions, and despite older selective CCK_{A} antagonists such as lorglumide and devazepide having had only limited success in trials and ultimately never making it into clinical use, dexloxiglumide is being investigated as a potential treatment for a variety of gastrointestinal problems including irritable bowel syndrome, dyspepsia, constipation and pancreatitis, and has had moderate success so far although trials are still ongoing.
