= Asperlicin =

Names
- Preferred IUPAC name (7S)-7-{[(2S,9S,9aS)-9-Hydroxy-2-(2-methylpropyl)-3-oxo-2,3,9,9a-tetrahydro-1H-imidazo[1,2-a]indol-9-yl]methyl}-6,7-dihydroquinazolino[3,2-a][1,4]benzodiazepine-5,13-dione

Identifiers
CAS Number	93413-04-8
3D model (JSmol)	Interactive image
ChEMBL	ChEMBL283117
ChemSpider	2299674
PubChem CID	3035433
UNII	U0MJE9LRXV
CompTox Dashboard (EPA)	DTXSID20918456
- InChI: InChI=1S/C31H29N5O4/c1-17(2)15-22-29(39)36-25-14-8-5-11-20(25)31(40,30(36)34-22)16-23-26-32-21-12-6-3-9-18(21)28(38)35(26)24-13-7-4-10-19(24)27(37)33-23/h3-14,17,22-23,30,34,40H,15-16H2,1-2H3,(H,33,37)/t22-,23-,30-,31-/m0/s1 Key: MGMRIOLWEROPJY-FPACPZPDSA-N; InChI=1/C31H29N5O4/c1-17(2)15-22-29(39)36-25-14-8-5-11-20(25)31(40,30(36)34-22)16-23-26-32-21-12-6-3-9-18(21)28(38)35(26)24-13-7-4-10-19(24)27(37)33-23/h3-14,17,22-23,30,34,40H,15-16H2,1-2H3,(H,33,37)/t22-,23-,30-,31-/m0/s1 Key: MGMRIOLWEROPJY-FPACPZPDBR
- SMILES: O=C1c7ccccc7/N=C3\N1c2ccccc2C(=O)N[C@H]3C[C@]6(O)c4c(cccc4)N5C(=O)[C@@H](N[C@@H]56)CC(C)C

Properties
Chemical formula	C_{31}H_{29}N_{5}O_{4}
Molar mass	535.593 g/mol
- Except where otherwise noted, data are given for materials in their standard state (at 25 °C [77 °F], 100 kPa). verify (what is ?) Infobox references

Asperlicin is a mycotoxin, derived from the fungus Aspergillus alliaceus. It acts as a selective antagonist for the cholecystokinin receptor CCK_{A}, and has been used as a lead compound for the development of a number of benzodiazepine-type CCK_{A} antagonists with potential clinical applications (e.g devazepide). He et al. 1998 present a synthesis from aryl iodide and vinyl iodide.
