= C5H9N3 =

The molecular formula C_{5}H_{9}N_{3} (molar mass: 111.15 g/mol, exact mass: 111.0796 u) may refer to:

- Betazole (also called ametazole)
- Histamine
