= ATC code V04 =

ATC code V04 Diagnostic agents is a therapeutic subgroup of the Anatomical Therapeutic Chemical Classification System, a system of alphanumeric codes developed by the World Health Organization (WHO) for the classification of drugs and other medical products. Subgroup V04 is part of the anatomical group V Various.

Codes for veterinary use (ATCvet codes) can be created by placing the letter Q in front of the human ATC code: for example, QV04. ATCvet codes without corresponding human ATC codes are cited with the leading Q in the following list.
National versions of the ATC classification may include additional codes not present in this list, which follows the WHO version.

== V04B Urine tests ==
Empty group

== V04C Other diagnostic agents ==
=== V04CA Tests for diabetes ===
V04CA01 Tolbutamide
V04CA02 Glucose

=== V04CB Tests for fat absorption ===
V04CB01 Vitamin A concentrates

=== V04CC Tests for bile duct patency ===
V04CC01 Sorbitol
V04CC02 Magnesium sulfate
V04CC03 Sincalide
V04CC04 Ceruletide

=== V04CD Tests for pituitary function ===
V04CD01 Metyrapone
V04CD03 Sermorelin
V04CD04 Corticorelin
V04CD05 Somatorelin
V04CD06 Macimorelin

=== V04CE Tests for liver functional capacity ===
V04CE01 Galactose
V04CE02 Sulfobromophthalein
V04CE03 Methacetin (^{13}C)

=== V04CF Tuberculosis diagnostics ===
V04CF01 Tuberculin
V04CF02 Mycobacterium tuberculosis, recombinant antigens

=== V04CG Tests for gastric secretion ===
V04CG01 Cation exchange resins
V04CG02 Betazole
V04CG03 Histamine phosphate
V04CG04 Pentagastrin
V04CG05 Methylthioninium chloride
V04CG30 Caffeine and sodium benzoate

=== V04CH Tests for renal function and ureteral injuries ===
V04CH01 Inulin and other polyfructosans
V04CH02 Indigo carmine
V04CH03 Phenolsulfonphthalein
V04CH04 Alsactide
V04CH05 Relmapirazin
V04CH30 Aminohippuric acid

=== V04CJ Tests for thyreoidea function ===
V04CJ01 Thyrotropin
V04CJ02 Protirelin

=== V04CK Tests for pancreatic function ===
V04CK01 Secretin
V04CK02 Pancreozymin (cholecystokinin)
V04CK03 Bentiromide

=== QV04CV Tests for respiratory function ===
QV04CV01 Lobeline

=== V04CM Tests for fertility disturbances ===
V04CM01 Gonadorelin

=== V04CX Other diagnostic agents ===
V04CX01 Indocyanine green
V04CX02 Folic acid
V04CX03 Methacholine
V04CX04 Mannitol
V04CX05 ^{13}C-urea
V04CX06 Hexaminolevulinate
V04CX07 Edrophonium
V04CX08 Carbon monoxide
V04CX09 Patent blue
V04CX10 Pafolacianine
V04CX11 Lithium chloride
V04CX12 Xenon
V04CX13 Pegulicianine
