= Cholecystokinin receptor =

G-protein coupled receptor

cholecystokinin A receptor

Identifiers
- Symbol: CCKAR
- NCBI gene: 886
- HGNC: 1570
- OMIM: 118444
- RefSeq: NM_000730
- UniProt: P32238

Other data
- Locus: Chr. 4 p15.2-p15.1
Search for
- Structures: Swiss-model
- Domains: InterPro

cholecystokinin B receptor

Identifiers
- Symbol: CCKBR
- NCBI gene: 887
- HGNC: 1571
- OMIM: 118445
- RefSeq: NM_176875
- UniProt: P32239

Other data
- Locus: Chr. 11 p15.4
Search for
- Structures: Swiss-model
- Domains: InterPro

Cholecystokinin receptors or CCK receptors are a group of G-protein coupled receptors which bind the peptide hormones cholecystokinin (CCK) and gastrin. There are two different subtypes CCK_{A} and CCK_{B} which are ~50% homologous: Various cholecystokinin antagonists have been developed and are used in research, although the only drug of this class that has been widely marketed to date is the anti-ulcer drug proglumide.

Protein	Gene	Tissue distribution	Preferred ligand	Function	Mechanism
CCK_{A} (CCK_{1})	CCKAR	primarily gastrointestinal tract, lesser amounts in the CNS	sulfated CCK >> nonsulfated CCK ≈ nonsulfated CCK	stimulation of bicarb secretion, gall bladder emptying and inhibiting gut motility	G_{q}
CCK_{B} (CCK_{2})	CCKBR	primarily CNS, lesser amounts in the gastrointestinal tract	gastrin ≈ CCK (receptor does not discriminate between sulfated and nonsulfated peptides)	regulation of nociception, anxiety, memory and hunger	G_{q}/G_{11}
