= Cholecystokinin B receptor =

Protein-coding gene

CCKBR
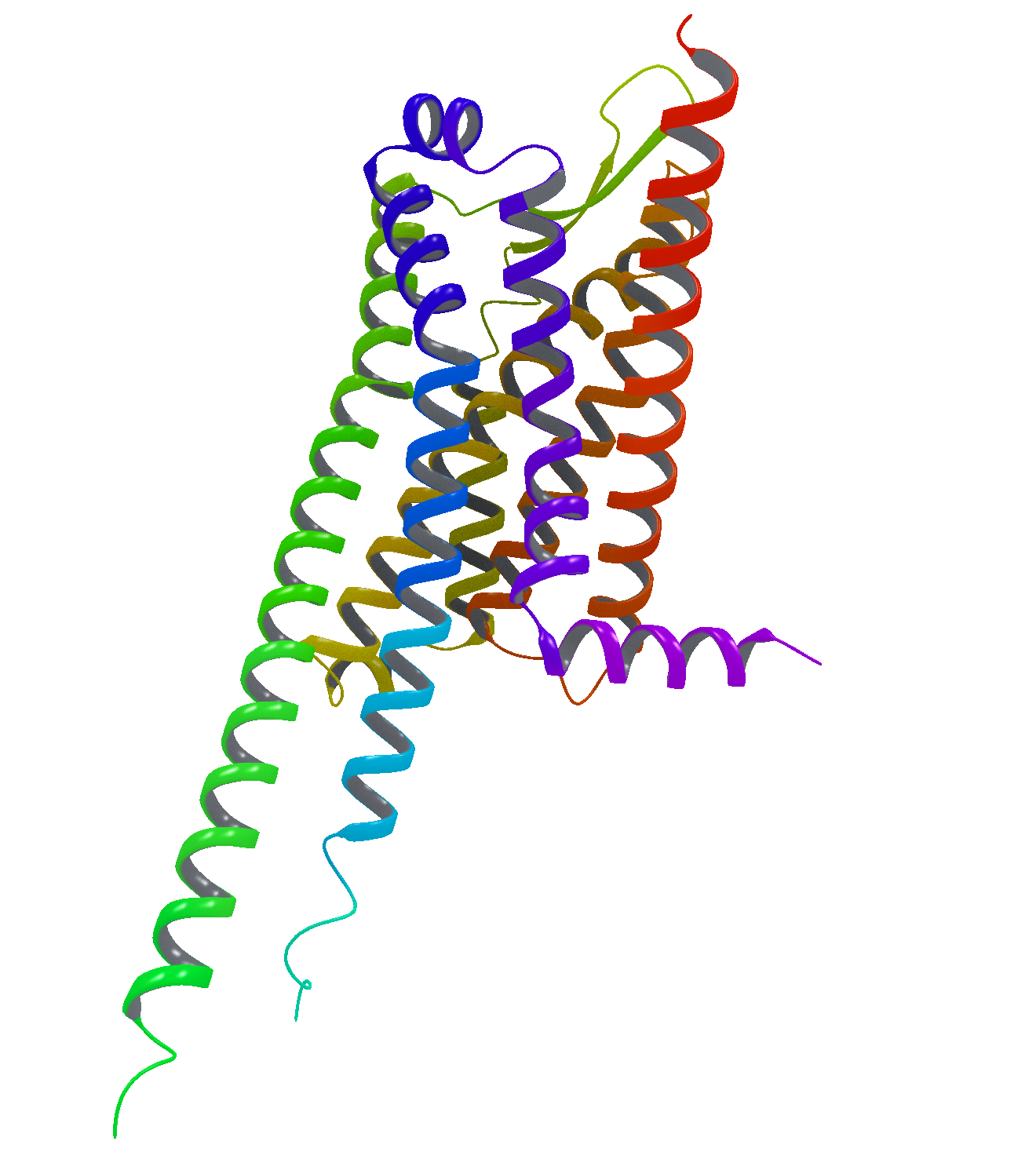

Identifiers
- Aliases: CCKBR, CCK-B, CCK2R, GASR, cholecystokinin B receptor
- External IDs: OMIM: 118445; MGI: 99479; GeneCards: CCKBR
Available structures
PDB	Ortholog search: PDBe RCSB
PDB	List of PDB id codes 1L4T

Gene location (Human)
Chr.	Chromosome 11 (human)
Band	11p15.4	Start	6,259,806 bp
Band	11p15.4	End	6,272,127 bp

Gene location (Mouse)
Chr.	Chromosome 7 (mouse)
Band	7 E3|7 55.86 cM	Start	105,074,938 bp
Band	7 E3|7 55.86 cM	End	105,120,105 bp
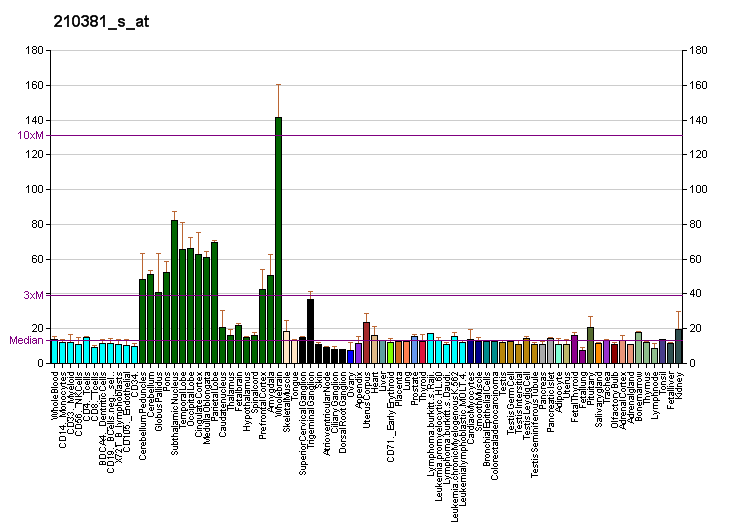
RNA expression pattern
Bgee	Human / Mouse (ortholog); Top expressed in: Brodmann area 10; frontal pole; body of stomach; paraflocculus of cerebellum; right frontal lobe; dorsolateral prefrontal cortex; cingulate gyrus; middle temporal gyrus; anterior cingulate cortex; Brodmann area 46 / Top expressed in: primary motor cortex; perirhinal cortex; piriform cortex; prefrontal cortex; entorhinal cortex; Ileal epithelium; primary visual cortex; anterior amygdaloid area; superior frontal gyrus; inferior colliculi; More reference expression data
BioGPS	More reference expression data
Gene ontology
Molecular function	G protein-coupled receptor activity; signal transducer activity; 1-phosphatidylinositol-3-kinase regulator activity; protein binding; type B gastrin/cholecystokinin receptor binding; gastrin receptor activity; cholecystokinin receptor activity; peptide hormone binding
Cellular component	integral component of membrane; membrane; plasma membrane
Biological process	gastric acid secretion; positive regulation of cytosolic calcium ion concentration; cell surface receptor signaling pathway; positive regulation of cell population proliferation; cell population proliferation; digestive tract development; signal transduction; gland development; regulation of phosphatidylinositol 3-kinase activity; G protein-coupled receptor signaling pathway; phospholipase C-activating G protein-coupled receptor signaling pathway; cholecystokinin signaling pathway; pH reduction
Sources:Amigo / QuickGO
Orthologs
Databases	NCBI: entry; OMA: entry
Species	Human	Mouse
Entrez	887	12426
Ensembl	ENSG00000110148	ENSMUSG00000030898
UniProt	P32239	P56481
RefSeq (mRNA)	NM_176875; NM_001318029; NM_001363552	NM_007627
RefSeq (protein)	NP_001304958; NP_795344; NP_001350481	NP_031653
Location (UCSC)	Chr 11: 6.26 – 6.27 Mb	Chr 7: 105.07 – 105.12 Mb
PubMed search
- Wikidata
View/Edit Human	View/Edit Mouse

The cholecystokinin B receptor also known as CCKBR or CCK_{2} is a protein that in humans is encoded by the CCKBR gene.

This gene encodes a G protein-coupled receptor for gastrin and cholecystokinin (CCK), regulatory peptides of the brain and gastrointestinal tract. This protein is a type B gastrin receptor, which has a high affinity for both sulfated and nonsulfated CCK analogs and is found principally in the central nervous system and the gastrointestinal tract. A misspliced transcript variant including an intron has been observed in cells from colorectal and pancreatic tumors.

== CNS effects ==
CCK receptors significantly influence neurotransmission in the brain, regulating anxiety, feeding, and locomotion. CCK-B expression may correlate parallel to anxiety and depression phenotypes in humans. CCK-B receptors possess a complex regulation of dopamine activity in the brain. CCK-B activation appears to possess a general inhibitory action on dopamine activity in the brain, opposing the dopamine-enhancing effects of CCK-A. However, the effects of CCK-B on dopamine activity vary depending on location. CCK-B antagonism enhances dopamine release in rat striatum. Activation enhances GABA release in rat anterior nucleus accumbens. CCK-B receptors modulate dopamine release, and influence the development of tolerance to opioids. CCK-B activation decreases amphetamine-induced DA release, and contributes to individual variability in response to amphetamine.

In rats, CCK-B antagonism prevents the stress-induced reactivation of cocaine-induced conditioned place preference, and prevents the long-term maintenance and reinstatement of morphine-induced CPP. Blockade of CCK-B potentiates cocaine-induced dopamine overflow in rat striatum. CCK-B may pose a modulatory role in Parkinson's disease. Blockade of CCK-B in dopamine-depleted squirrel monkeys induces significant enhancement of locomotor response to L-DOPA. One study shows that visual hallucinations in Parkinson's disease are associated with cholecystokinin −45C>T polymorphism, and this association is still observed in the presence of the cholecystokinin-A receptor TC/CC genotype, indicating a possible interaction of these two genes in the visual hallucinogenesis in Parkinson's disease.

== Gastrointestinal tract ==
The cholecystokinin B receptor is stimulated by CCK and gastrin in the stomach during digestion.

== Selective ligands ==
The cholecystokinin B receptor responds to a number of ligands.

=== Agonists ===
- Cholecystokinin
- CCK-4
- Gastrin
- BBL-454

=== Antagonists ===
- Proglumide
- CI-988
- CI-1015
- L-365,260
- L-369,293
- YF476
- YM-022
- RP-69758
- LY-225,910
- LY-288,513
- PD-135,158
- PD-145,942

=== Inverse agonists ===
- L-740,093

== See also ==
- Cholecystokinin receptor
- Cholecystokinin antagonist
