= Ceruletide =

Chemical compound

Clinical data
- AHFS/Drugs.com: International Drug Names
- ATC code: V04CC04 (WHO)

Identifiers
- IUPAC name: (3S)-3-{[(1S)-1-carbamoyl-2-phenylethyl]carbamoyl}-3-[(2S)-2-[(2S)-2-{2-[(3R)-2-[(2S)-2-[(2S)-2-[(2S)-4-carbamoyl-2-{[(2S)-5-oxopyrrolidin-2-yl]formamido}butanamido]-3-carboxypropanamido]-3-[4-(sulfooxy)phenyl]propanamido]-3-hydroxybutanamido]acetamido}-3-(1H-indol-3-yl)propanamido]-4-(methylsulfanyl)butanamido]propanoic acid
- CAS Number: 17650-98-5
- PubChem CID: 16129675
- DrugBank: DB00403
- ChemSpider: 147304
- UNII: 888Y08971B
- KEGG: D03442
- ChEBI: CHEBI:59219
- ChEMBL: ChEMBL1201355
- CompTox Dashboard (EPA): DTXSID8040434

Chemical and physical data
- Formula: C_{58}H_{73}N_{13}O_{21}S_{2}
- Molar mass: 1352.41 g·mol^{−1}

Ceruletide (INN), also known as cerulein or caerulein, is a ten amino acid oligopeptide that stimulates smooth muscle and increases digestive secretions. Ceruletide is similar in action and composition to cholecystokinin. It stimulates gastric, biliary, and pancreatic secretion; and certain smooth muscle. It is used in paralytic ileus and as diagnostic aid in pancreatic malfunction. It is used to induce pancreatitis in experimental animal models.

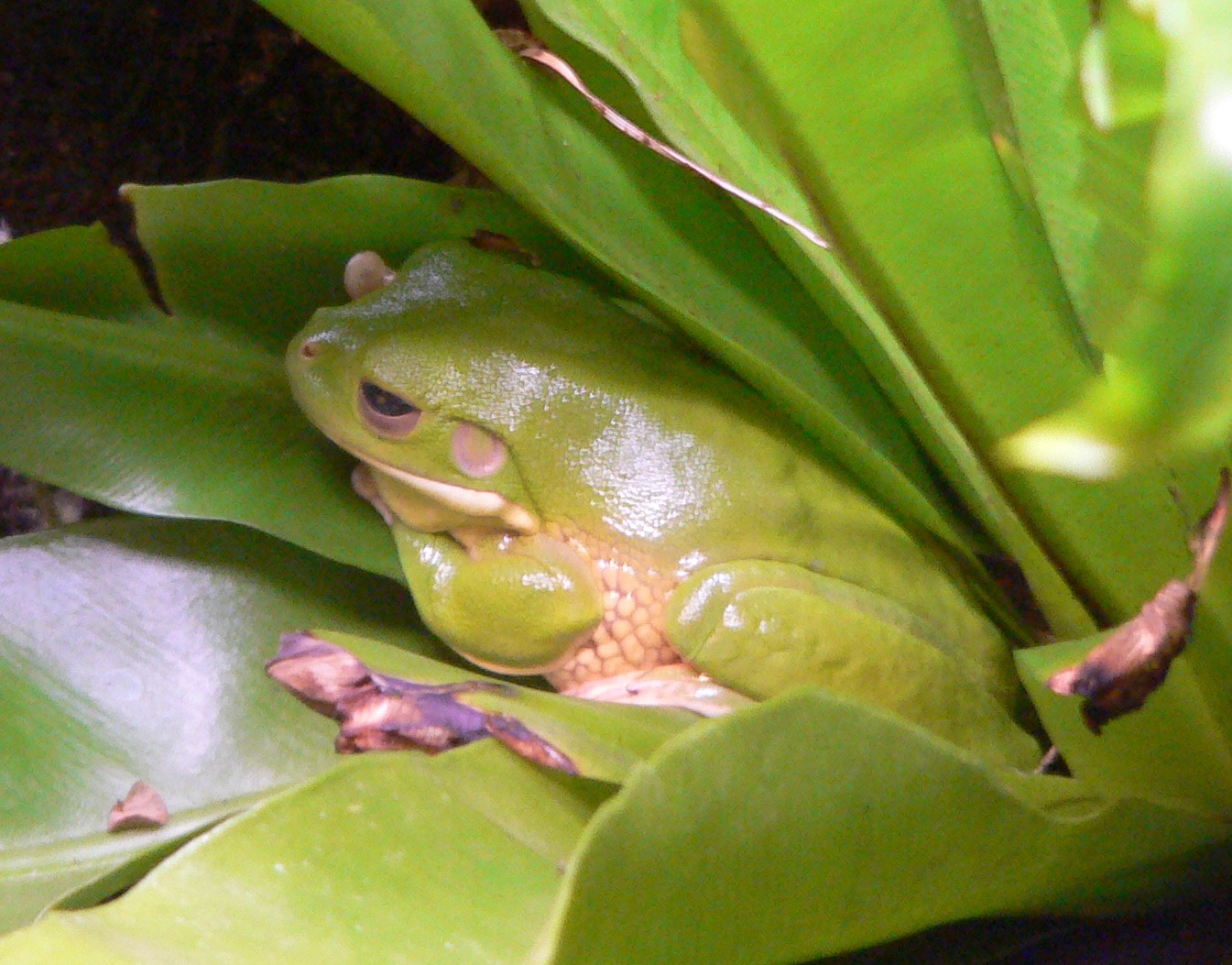
The tree frog Ranoidea caerulea, formerly named Hyla caerulae.

Ceruletide was discovered and its structure elucidated in 1967 by Australian and Italian scientists from dried skins of the Australian green tree frog (Ranoidea caerulea, formerly Hyla caerulea). Its amino acid sequence is Pglu-Gln-Asp-Tyr[SO_{3}H]-Thr-Gly-Trp-Met-Asp-Phe-NH_{2}.

== Induction of pancreatitis ==
Ceruletide upregulates pancreatic acinar cell intercellular adhesion molecule-1 (ICAM-1) proteins through intracellular upregulation of NF-κB. Surface ICAM-1 in turn promotes neutrophil adhesion onto acinar cells enhancing pancreatic inflammation. In addition to promoting the inflammatory cell reaction to acinar cells, ceruletide induces pancreatitis through dysregulation of digestive enzyme production and cytoplasmic vacuolization, leading to acinar cell death and pancreatic edema. Ceruletide also activates NADPH oxidase, a source of reactive oxygen species contributing to inflammation, as well as the Janus kinase/signal transducer, another inflammation inducer.

== See also ==
- Pancreatitis
