= Benzotript =

Cholecystokinin antagonist

Clinical data
- Other names: Benzotrypt; CR-501; N-(p-Chlorobenzoyl)-L-tryptophan; N-(4-Chlorobenzoyl)-L-tryptophan; N-[(4-Chlorophenyl)carbonyl]tryptophan

Identifiers
- IUPAC name: (2S)-2-[(4-chlorobenzoyl)amino]-3-(1H-indol-3-yl)propanoic acid
- CAS Number: 39544-74-6
- PubChem CID: 2060890
- ChemSpider: 1553298
- UNII: LS5O682BRO
- ChEMBL: ChEMBL63544
- CompTox Dashboard (EPA): DTXSID501043305
- ECHA InfoCard: 100.049.528

Chemical and physical data
- Formula: C_{18}H_{15}ClN_{2}O_{3}
- Molar mass: 342.78 g·mol^{−1}
- 3D model (JSmol): Interactive image
- SMILES: C1=CC=C2C(=C1)C(=CN2)C[C@@H](C(=O)O)NC(=O)C3=CC=C(C=C3)Cl
- InChI: InChI=1S/C18H15ClN2O3/c19-13-7-5-11(6-8-13)17(22)21-16(18(23)24)9-12-10-20-15-4-2-1-3-14(12)15/h1-8,10,16,20H,9H2,(H,21,22)(H,23,24)/t16-/m0/s1; Key:QJERBBQXOMUURJ-INIZCTEOSA-N

Benzotript (INN), also known as N-(p-chlorobenzoyl)-L-tryptophan, is a muscle relaxant that inhibits gastric secretion and was never marketed. It is a tryptamine derivative and the N-(4-chlorobenzoyl) analogue of the amino acid tryptophan. Similarly to proglumide (N^{2}-benzoyl-N,N-dipropyl-α-glutamine), the drug acts as a competitive and non-selective cholecystokinin receptor antagonist. Other more potent tryptophan derivatives have also been developed as cholecystokinin (CCK) antagonists.
