= Pegulicianine =

Medication

Clinical data
- Trade names: Lumisight
- AHFS/Drugs.com: Lumisight
- License data: US DailyMed: Pegulicianine
- Routes of administration: Intravenous
- ATC code: V04CX13 (WHO)

Legal status
- Legal status: US: ℞-only

Identifiers
- CAS Number: 2230217-17-9
- DrugBank: DB18731
- UNII: T6HE85WN0Q

Pegulicianine, sold under the brand name Lumisight, is an optical imaging agent. It is given via intravenous injection.

Pegulicianine was approved for medical use in the United States in April 2024. The US Food and Drug Administration (FDA) considers it to be a first-in-class medication.

== Medical uses ==
Pegulicianine is indicated for fluorescence imaging in adults with breast cancer as an adjunct for the intraoperative detection of cancerous tissue within the resection cavity following removal of the primary specimen during lumpectomy surgery.

== Mechanism of action ==
Pegulicianine is non-fluorescent in its intact parent form. However, in breast cancer tissue, where cathepsins and matrix metalloproteinases are overexpressed, it is enzymatically cleaved into two fragments, one of which is fluorescent.

Pegulicianine consists of the following four components that are covalently linked to each other:

- A far-red cyanine dye known as Cy5, which has a peak absorption near 650 nm and emission around 675 nm, allowing detection by imaging systems.
- A non-fluorescent chromophore called QSY21 (a rhodamine derivative), which functions as a fluorescence quencher. QSY21 absorbs the emission from Cy5, suppressing fluorescence until enzymatic cleavage occurs.
- A tripeptide linker (Gly-Gly-Arg), which is cleaved by tumor-associated proteases (cathepsins and matrix metalloproteinases). Once cleaved, Cy5 is released from proximity to QSY21, restoring its fluorescence.
- A polyethylene glycol (PEG) side chain that enhances water solubility, protects the molecule from enzymatic degradation, extends circulation time by increasing its hydrodynamic radius—thereby reducing renal clearance—and lowers immunogenicity.

== History ==
The efficacy and safety of pegulicianine were evaluated in a multicenter, intra-participant controlled clinical trial (NCT03686215) of participants with breast cancer undergoing lumpectomy surgery. A total of 357 participants underwent image-guided surgery with the Lumicell DVS following standard of care lumpectomy. When positive pegulicianine signal was detected, the tissue was resected with a cavity shave procedure. The study assessed the proportion of participants receiving pegulicianine who had residual cancer detected and removed after the standard of care lumpectomy. A total of 27 of 357 participants (7.6%) had cancer in at least one pegulicianine-guided shave. The study also assessed the image-level sensitivity (ability to designate an imaged region with disease as positive) and specificity (ability to designate an imaged region without disease as negative) for detection of cancer in the lumpectomy cavity. Sensitivity was 49.1% and specificity was 86.5%. Forty-three percent (43%) of participants had at least one false positive image and 8% of participants had at least one false negative image.

== Society and culture ==
=== Legal status ===
Pegulicianine was approved for medical use in the United States in April 2024. The US Food and Drug Administration granted the application for pegulicianine fast track and priority review designations.

=== Names ===
Pegulicianine is the international nonproprietary name.
