= Sincalide =

Chemical compound

Clinical data
- Other names: 1-De(5-oxo-L-proline)-2-de-L-glutamine- 5-L-methioninecaerulein, 3-[[2-[[2-[[2-[[2-[[2-[(2-amino-3-carboxy-propanoyl) amino]-3-(4-sulfooxyphenyl)propanoyl]amino]-4- methylsulfanyl-butanoyl]amino]acetyl]amino]-3- (1H-indol-3-yl)propanoyl]amino]-4-methylsulfanyl- butanoyl]amino]-3-[(1-carbamoyl-2-phenyl-ethyl) carbamoyl]propanoic acid
- AHFS/Drugs.com: Micromedex Detailed Consumer Information
- Routes of administration: Intravenous
- ATC code: V04CC03 (WHO)

Legal status
- Legal status: UK: Available on a named-patient basis; US: ℞-only

Identifiers
- IUPAC name: α-aspartyl-O-sulfotyrosylmethionylglycyltryptophylmethionyl-α-aspartylphenylalaninamide
- CAS Number: 25126-32-3
- PubChem CID: 32800
- IUPHAR/BPS: 864
- DrugBank: DB09142
- ChemSpider: 8009168
- UNII: M03GIQ7Z6P
- KEGG: D05845
- ChEMBL: ChEMBL1121
- CompTox Dashboard (EPA): DTXSID7048617
- ECHA InfoCard: 100.042.384

Chemical and physical data
- Formula: C_{49}H_{62}N_{10}O_{16}S_{3}
- Molar mass: 1143.27 g·mol^{−1}
- 3D model (JSmol): Interactive image
- SMILES: CSCC[C@@H](C(=O)NCC(=O)N[C@@H](CC1=CNC2=CC=CC=C21)C(=O)N[C@@H](CCSC)C(=O)N[C@@H](CC(=O)O)C(=O)N[C@@H](CC3=CC=CC=C3)C(=O)N)NC(=O)[C@H](CC4=CC=C(C=C4)OS(=O)(=O)O)NC(=O)[C@H](CC(=O)O)N
- InChI: InChI=1S/C49H62N10O16S3/c1-76-18-16-34(55-47(69)37(58-44(66)32(50)23-41(61)62)21-28-12-14-30(15-13-28)75-78(72,73)74)45(67)53-26-40(60)54-38(22-29-25-52-33-11-7-6-10-31(29)33)48(70)56-35(17-19-77-2)46(68)59-39(24-42(63)64)49(71)57-36(43(51)65)20-27-8-4-3-5-9-27/h3-15,25,32,34-39,52H,16-24,26,50H2,1-2H3,(H2,51,65)(H,53,67)(H,54,60)(H,55,69)(H,56,70)(H,57,71)(H,58,66)(H,59,68)(H,61,62)(H,63,64)(H,72,73,74)/t32-,34-,35-,36-,37-,38-,39-/m0/s1; Key:IZTQOLKUZKXIRV-YRVFCXMDSA-N

Sincalide (INN) is a cholecystokinetic drug administered by injection to aid in diagnosing disorders of the gallbladder and pancreas. It is the 8-amino acid C-terminal fragment of cholecystokinin, and also known as CCK-8.

Common adverse effects following administration include abdominal discomfort and nausea. These effects are more pronounced following rapid infusion.

== Clinical Use ==
=== Indications ===
Sincalide may be used to stimulate gallbladder contraction, as may be assessed by contrast agent cholecystography or ultrasonography, or to obtain by duodenal aspiration a sample of concentrated bile for analysis of cholesterol, bile salts, phospholipids, and crystals. It can also be used to stimulate pancreatic secretion (especially in conjunction with secretin) prior to obtaining a duodenal aspirate for analysis of enzyme activity, composition, and cytology. In some instances it is used to accelerate the transit of a barium meal through the small bowel, thereby decreasing the time and-extent of radiation associated with fluoroscopy and x-ray examination of the intestinal tract.
