= Bromsulfthalein =

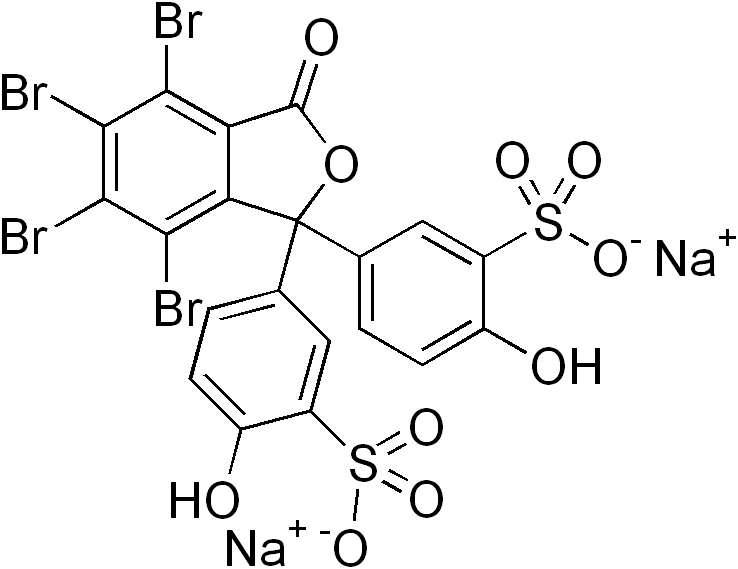

Names
- Preferred IUPAC name Disodium 3,3′-(4,5,6,7-tetrabromo-3-oxo-2-benzofuran-1,1(3H)-diyl)bis(6-hydroxybenzene-1-sulfonate)
- Other names Bromsulphthalein; Bromosulfophthalein; Bromosulphophthalein; BSP; Sulfobromophthalein

Identifiers
CAS Number	71-67-0
3D model (JSmol)	Interactive image
ChEMBL	ChEMBL453904
ChemSpider	6046
ECHA InfoCard	100.005.498
IUPHAR/BPS	4506
PubChem CID	6282
UNII	62E5JU30OV
CompTox Dashboard (EPA)	DTXSID4075378
- InChI: InChI=1S/C20H10Br4O10S2.2Na/c21-15-13-14(16(22)18(24)17(15)23)20(34-19(13)27,7-1-3-9(25)11(5-7)35(28,29)30)8-2-4-10(26)12(6-8)36(31,32)33;;/h1-6,25-26H,(H,28,29,30)(H,31,32,33);;/q;2*+1/p-2 Key: GHAFORRTMVIXHS-UHFFFAOYSA-L; InChI=1/C20H10Br4O10S2.2Na/c21-15-13-14(16(22)18(24)17(15)23)20(34-19(13)27,7-1-3-9(25)11(5-7)35(28,29)30)8-2-4-10(26)12(6-8)36(31,32)33;;/h1-6,25-26H,(H,28,29,30)(H,31,32,33);;/q;2*+1/p-2 Key: GHAFORRTMVIXHS-NUQVWONBAX
- SMILES: [Na+].[Na+].[O-]S(=O)(=O)c1c(O)ccc(c1)C3(OC(=O)c2c(Br)c(Br)c(Br)c(Br)c23)c4ccc(O)c(c4)S([O-])(=O)=O

Properties
Chemical formula	C_{20}H_{8}Br_{4}Na_{2}O_{10}S_{2}
Molar mass	837.99 g·mol^{−1}

Pharmacology
ATC code	V04CE02 (WHO)
- Except where otherwise noted, data are given for materials in their standard state (at 25 °C [77 °F], 100 kPa). verify (what is ?) Infobox references

Bromsulfthalein (also known as bromsulphthalein, bromosulfophthalein, and BSP) is a phthalein dye used in liver function tests. Determining the rate of removal of the dye from the blood stream gives a measure of liver function. The mechanism by which the liver detoxifies BSP is to attach it to glutathione which is the body’s master antioxidant.
