= Cholecystokinin A receptor =

Protein-coding gene in the species Homo sapiens

CCKAR
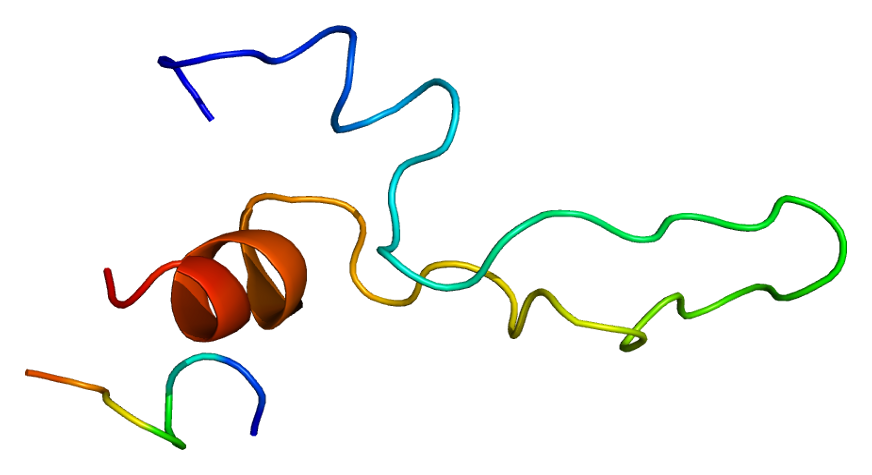

Identifiers
- Aliases: CCKAR, CCK-A, CCK1-R, CCK1R, CCKRA, cholecystokinin A receptor
- External IDs: OMIM: 118444; MGI: 99478; GeneCards: CCKAR
Available structures
PDB	Ortholog search: PDBe RCSB
PDB	List of PDB id codes 1D6G, 1HZN

Gene location (Human)
Chr.	Chromosome 4 (human)
Band	4p15.2	Start	26,481,396 bp
Band	4p15.2	End	26,490,484 bp

Gene location (Mouse)
Chr.	Chromosome 5 (mouse)
Band	5 C1|5 29.52 cM	Start	53,855,118 bp
Band	5 C1|5 29.52 cM	End	53,865,047 bp
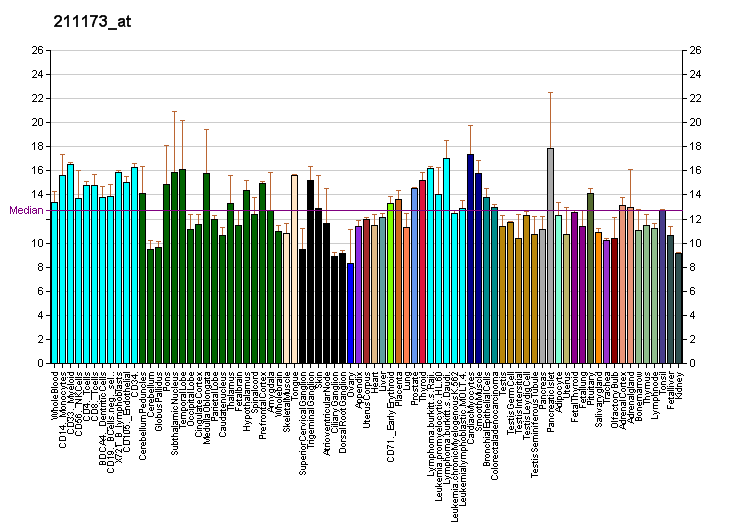

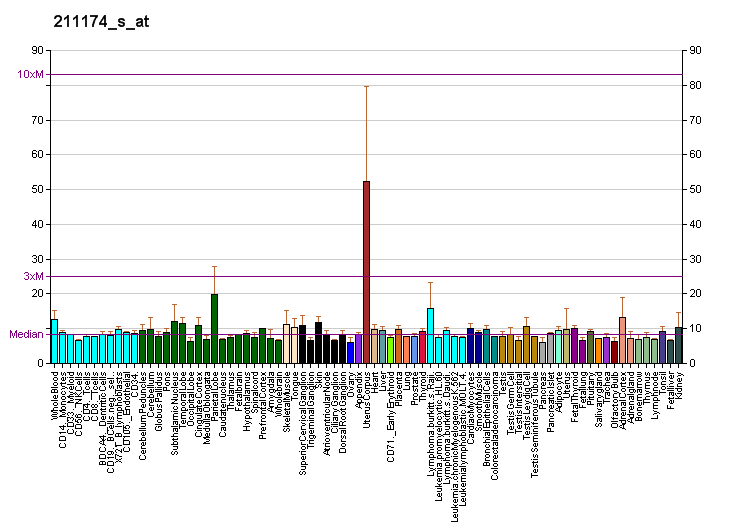
RNA expression pattern
Bgee	Human / Mouse (ortholog); Top expressed in: gallbladder; body of stomach; fundus; embryo; islet of Langerhans; duodenum; ganglionic eminence; hypothalamus; sensory organ; tonsil / Top expressed in: epithelium of stomach; right lung lobe; lumbar spinal ganglion; right kidney; proximal tubule; pyloric antrum; human kidney; left lung; left lung lobe; thyroid gland; More reference expression data
BioGPS	More reference expression data
Gene ontology
Molecular function	G protein-coupled receptor activity; signal transducer activity; peptide binding; cholecystokinin receptor activity; peptide hormone binding
Cellular component	integral component of membrane; plasma membrane; integral component of plasma membrane; membrane
Biological process	axonogenesis; neuron migration; phospholipase C-activating G protein-coupled receptor signaling pathway; forebrain development; signal transduction; regulation of hormone secretion; cellular response to hormone stimulus; response to peptide; G protein-coupled receptor signaling pathway; cholecystokinin signaling pathway; feeding behavior
Sources:Amigo / QuickGO
Orthologs
Databases	NCBI: entry; OMA: entry
Species	Human	Mouse
Entrez	886	12425
Ensembl	ENSG00000163394	ENSMUSG00000029193
UniProt	P32238	O08786
RefSeq (mRNA)	NM_000730	NM_009827; NM_001347354
RefSeq (protein)	NP_000721	NP_001334283; NP_033957
Location (UCSC)	Chr 4: 26.48 – 26.49 Mb	Chr 5: 53.86 – 53.87 Mb
PubMed search
- Wikidata
View/Edit Human	View/Edit Mouse

Cholecystokinin A receptor, N-terminal domain
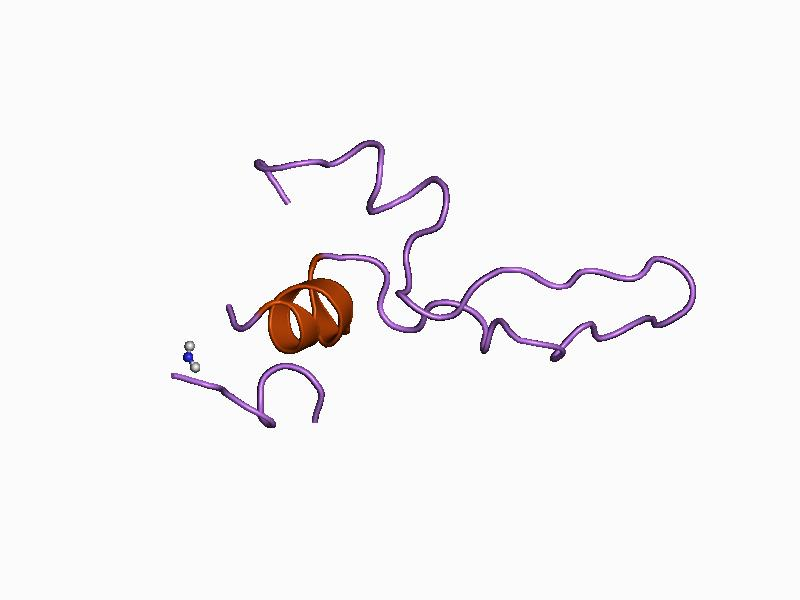
- molecular complex of cholecystokinin-8 and n-terminus of the cholecystokinin a receptor by nmr spectroscopy

Identifiers
- Symbol: CholecysA-Rec_N
- Pfam: PF09193
- InterPro: IPR015276
- SCOP2: 1d6g / SCOPe / SUPFAM
Available protein structures:
- PDB: IPR015276 PF09193 (ECOD; PDBsum)
- AlphaFold: IPR015276; PF09193

The Cholecystokinin A receptor is a human protein, also known as CCKAR or CCK_{1}, with CCK_{1} now being the IUPHAR-recommended name.

== Function ==
This gene encodes a G-protein coupled receptor that binds sulfated members of the cholecystokinin (CCK) family of peptide hormones. This receptor is a major physiologic mediator of pancreatic enzyme secretion and smooth muscle contraction of the gallbladder and stomach. In the central and peripheral nervous system this receptor regulates satiety and the release of beta-endorphin and dopamine.

The extracellular N-terminal domain of this protein adopts a tertiary structure consisting of a few helical turns and a disulfide-cross linked loop. It is required for interaction of the cholecystokinin A receptor with its corresponding hormonal ligand.

== Selective Ligands ==
=== Agonists ===
- Cholecystokinin
- CCK-4
- SR-146,131
- A-71623 - modified tetrapeptide, potent and selective CCK_{A} agonist, IC_{50} 3.7nM, 1200x selectivity over CCK_{B}, CAS# 130408-77-4

=== Antagonists ===
- Proglumide
- Lorglumide
- Devazepide
- Dexloxiglumide
- Asperlicin
- SR-27897
- IQM-95333
- JNJ-17156516

== See also ==
- Cholecystokinin receptor
- Cholecystokinin antagonist
