= Bentiromide =

Names
- Preferred IUPAC name 4-[(2S)-2-Benzamido-3-(4-hydroxyphenyl)propanamido]benzoic acid
- Other names (S)-4-((2-(benzoylamino)-3-(4-hydroxyphenyl) -1-oxopropyl)amino)benzoic acid (S)-p-(α-benzamido-p-hydroxyhydrocinnamamido) benzoic acid Benzoyltyrosyl-p-aminobenzoic acid (Btpaba)Chymex; N-benzoyl-L-tyrosyl-p-aminobenzoic acid P-((N-benzoyl-L-tyrosin)amido)benzoic acid Chymex (trade name)

Identifiers
CAS Number	37106-97-1
3D model (JSmol)	Interactive image
Abbreviations	Btpaba
ChEBI	CHEBI:31263
ChEMBL	ChEMBL1200368
ChemSpider	5329364
DrugBank	DB00522
ECHA InfoCard	100.048.484
EC Number	253-349-8
PubChem CID	6957673
UNII	239IF5W61J
CompTox Dashboard (EPA)	DTXSID2048377
- InChI: InChI=1S/C23H20N2O5/c26-19-12-6-15(7-13-19)14-20(25-21(27)16-4-2-1-3-5-16)22(28)24-18-10-8-17(9-11-18)23(29)30/h1-13,20,26H,14H2,(H,24,28)(H,25,27)(H,29,30)/t20-/m0/s1 Key: SPPTWHFVYKCNNK-FQEVSTJZSA-N; InChI=1/C23H20N2O5/c26-19-12-6-15(7-13-19)14-20(25-21(27)16-4-2-1-3-5-16)22(28)24-18-10-8-17(9-11-18)23(29)30/h1-13,20,26H,14H2,(H,24,28)(H,25,27)(H,29,30)/t20-/m0/s1 Key: SPPTWHFVYKCNNK-FQEVSTJZBR
- SMILES: O=C(O)c1ccc(cc1)NC(=O)[C@@H](NC(=O)c2ccccc2)Cc3ccc(O)cc3

Properties
Chemical formula	C_{23}H_{20}N_{2}O_{5}
Molar mass	404.4153 g/mol

Pharmacology
ATC code	V04CK03 (WHO)
- Except where otherwise noted, data are given for materials in their standard state (at 25 °C [77 °F], 100 kPa). verify (what is ?) Infobox references

Bentiromide is a peptide used as a screening test for exocrine pancreatic insufficiency and to monitor the adequacy of supplemental pancreatic therapy. Bentiromide is not available in the United States or Canada; it was withdrawn in the US in October 1996.

== Side effects ==
Headache and gastrointestinal disturbances have been reported in patients taking bentiromide.

== Mechanism of action ==
Bentiromide is given by mouth as a noninvasive test. It is broken down by the pancreatic enzyme chymotrypsin, yielding p-aminobenzoic acid (PABA). The amount of PABA and its metabolites excreted in the urine is taken as a measure of the chymotrypsin-secreting activity of the pancreas.

== Chemistry ==
- XLogP=3.201
- H_bond_donor=4
- H_bond_acceptor=5

=== Synthesis ===
Bentiromide synthesis: Synthesis, in vitro and in vivo data:

It is synthesized by amide formation between ethyl p-aminobenzoate and N-benzoyl-tyrosine using N-methyl-morpholine and ethyl chlorocarbonate for activation. The resulting L-amide is selectively hydrolyzed by sequential use of dimsyl sodium (NaDMSO) and dilute acid to give bentiromide (4).

== See also ==
- Chronic pancreatitis
