= CI-988 =

Chemical compound

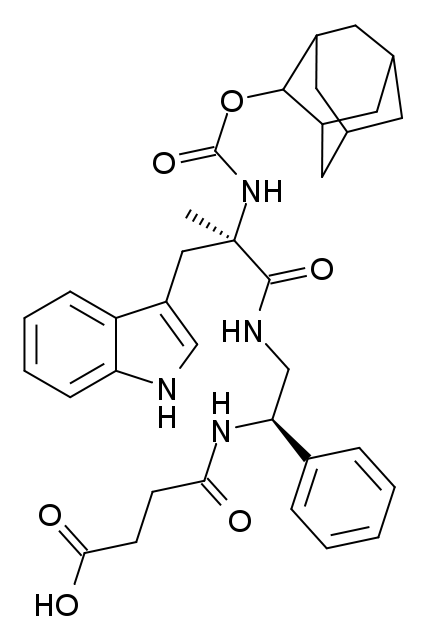

Identifiers
- IUPAC name: 4-([(1R)-2-([(2R)-3-(1H-indol-3-yl)-2-methyl-1-oxo-2-([(tricyclo[3.3.1.13,7]dec-2-yloxy) carbonyl]amino)propyl]amino)-1-phenylethyl]amino)-4-oxobutanoic acid
- CAS Number: 130332-27-3
- PubChem CID: 108186
- ChemSpider: 97266
- UNII: 2637PDX9SI
- ChEMBL: ChEMBL2062154

Chemical and physical data
- Formula: C_{35}H_{42}N_{4}O_{6}
- Molar mass: 614.743 g·mol^{−1}
- 3D model (JSmol): Interactive image
- SMILES: C[C@@](Cc1c[nH]c2c1cccc2)(C(=O)NC[C@@H](c3ccccc3)NC(=O)CCC(=O)O)NC(=O)OC4C5CC6CC(C5)CC4C6
- InChI: InChI=1S/C35H42N4O6/c1-35(18-26-19-36-28-10-6-5-9-27(26)28,39-34(44)45-32-24-14-21-13-22(16-24)17-25(32)15-21)33(43)37-20-29(23-7-3-2-4-8-23)38-30(40)11-12-31(41)42/h2-10,19,21-22,24-25,29,32,36H,11-18,20H2,1H3,(H,37,43)(H,38,40)(H,39,44)(H,41,42)/t21?,22?,24?,25?,29-,32?,35+/m0/s1; Key:FVQSSYMRZKLFDR-ZABPBAJSSA-N

CI-988 (PD-134,308) is a drug which acts as a cholecystokinin antagonist, selective for the CCK_{B} subtype. In animal studies it showed anxiolytic effects and potentiated the analgesic action of both morphine and endogenous opioid peptides, as well as preventing the development of tolerance to opioids and reducing symptoms of withdrawal. Consequently, it was hoped that it might have clinical applications for the treatment of pain and anxiety in humans, but trial results were disappointing with only minimal therapeutic effects observed even at high doses. The reason for the failure of CI-988 and other CCK_{B} antagonists in humans despite their apparent promise in pre-clinical animal studies is unclear, although poor pharmacokinetic properties of the currently available drugs are a possible explanation, and CCK_{B} antagonists are still being researched for possible uses as adjuvants to boost the activity of other drugs.
