= Relmapirazin =

Chemical compound

Clinical data
- Trade names: Lumitrace
- Other names: MB-102
- ATC code: V04CH05 (WHO)

Identifiers
- IUPAC name: (2R)-2-[[3,6-Diamino-5-[[(1R)-1-carboxy-2-hydroxyethyl]carbamoyl]pyrazine-2-carbonyl]amino]-3-hydroxypropanoic acid
- CAS Number: 1313706-17-0
- PubChem CID: 53389120
- UNII: Q3UQB8PQ6H
- KEGG: D11637
- ChEMBL: ChEMBL1949708

Chemical and physical data
- Formula: C_{12}H_{16}N_{6}O_{8}
- Molar mass: 372.294 g·mol^{−1}
- 3D model (JSmol): Interactive image
- SMILES: C([C@H](C(=O)O)NC(=O)C1=C(N=C(C(=N1)N)C(=O)N[C@H](CO)C(=O)O)N)O
- InChI: InChI=1S/C12H16N6O8/c13-7-5(9(21)15-3(1-19)11(23)24)17-8(14)6(18-7)10(22)16-4(2-20)12(25)26/h3-4,19-20H,1-2H2,(H2,14,17)(H2,13,18)(H,15,21)(H,16,22)(H,23,24)(H,25,26)/t3-,4-/m1/s1; Key:XHNJXRDGTITISI-QWWZWVQMSA-N

Relmapirazin is an FDA approved fluorescent tracer that is exclusively excreted renally and is used to measure glomerular filtration rate of the kidneys.

Using plasma sampling, relmapirazin has been shown to have the same properties and accuracy as iohexol for determining glomerular filtration rate in human subjects of varying kidney function. Furthermore, transdermal optical detection of the change in concentration of intravenously injected relmapirazin has been used to estimate glomerular filtration rate with excellent accuracy in human subjects of varying kidney function and skin color.
