= Cholecystokinin =

Hormone of the gastrointestinal system

CCK

Identifiers
- Aliases: CCK, cholecystokinin
- External IDs: OMIM: 118440; MGI: 88297; GeneCards: CCK

Gene location (Human)
| Chr. | Chromosome 3 (human) |
| Band | 3p22.1 | Start | 42,257,825 bp |
| Band | 3p22.1 | End | 42,266,185 bp |

Gene location (Mouse)
| Chr. | Chromosome 9 (mouse) |
| Band | 9 72.43 cM|9 F4 | Start | 121,318,890 bp |
| Band | 9 72.43 cM|9 F4 | End | 121,324,760 bp |
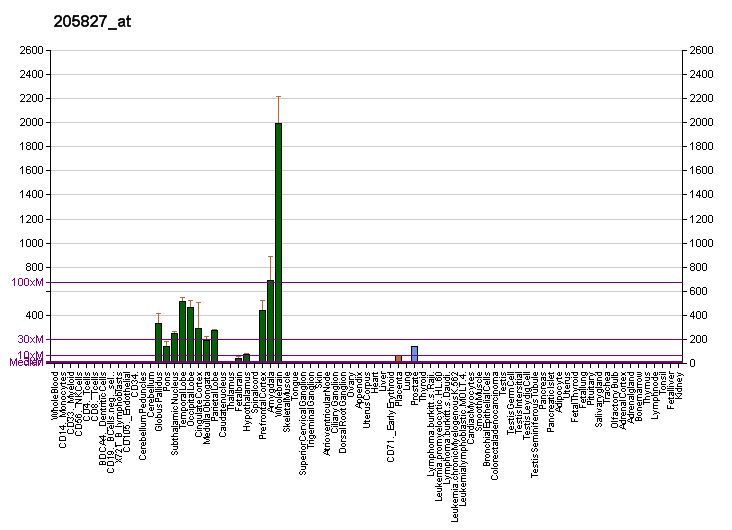
RNA expression pattern
| Bgee | Human / Mouse (ortholog); Top expressed in: frontal pole; Brodmann area 10; orbitofrontal cortex; middle temporal gyrus; dorsolateral prefrontal cortex; cingulate gyrus; anterior cingulate cortex; amygdala; Brodmann area 9; superior frontal gyrus / Top expressed in: primary motor cortex; dentate gyrus of hippocampal formation granule cell; primary visual cortex; CA3 field; lateral geniculate nucleus; Region I of hippocampus proper; medial dorsal nucleus; perirhinal cortex; superior frontal gyrus; entorhinal cortex; More reference expression data |
| BioGPS | More reference expression data |
Gene ontology
| Molecular function | hormone activity; protein binding; neuropeptide hormone activity; peptide hormone receptor binding |
| Cellular component | perikaryon; extracellular region; terminal bouton; soma; dendrite; axon hillock; axon initial segment; extracellular space; axon |
| Biological process | regulation of sensory perception of pain; eating behavior; behavioral fear response; negative regulation of appetite; protein kinase C-activating G protein-coupled receptor signaling pathway; positive regulation of mitochondrial depolarization; positive regulation of glutamate secretion; positive regulation of cell population proliferation; positive regulation of protein oligomerization; positive regulation of peptidyl-tyrosine phosphorylation; positive regulation of apoptotic process; activation of cysteine-type endopeptidase activity involved in apoptotic process; signal transduction; release of cytochrome c from mitochondria; apoptotic process; neuron migration; axonogenesis; regulation of signaling receptor activity; G protein-coupled receptor signaling pathway; memory; visual learning; negative regulation of eating behavior; positive regulation of sensory perception of pain; negative regulation of behavioral fear response; positive regulation of behavioral fear response; digestion |
Sources:Amigo / QuickGO
Orthologs
| Databases | NCBI: entry; OMA: entry |
| Species | Human | Mouse |
| Entrez | 885 | 12424 |
| Ensembl | ENSG00000187094 | ENSMUSG00000032532 |
| UniProt | P06307 | P09240 |
| RefSeq (mRNA) | NM_000729; NM_001174138 | NM_031161; NM_001284508 |
| RefSeq (protein) | NP_000720; NP_001167609 | NP_001271437; NP_112438 |
| Location (UCSC) | Chr 3: 42.26 – 42.27 Mb | Chr 9: 121.32 – 121.32 Mb |
| PubMed search |
- Wikidata
| View/Edit Human | View/Edit Mouse |

Cholecystokinin (CCK or CCK-PZ; from Greek chole 'bile', cysto 'sac', kinin 'move'; hence, 'move the bile-sac', i.e., the gallbladder) is a peptide hormone of the gastrointestinal system responsible for stimulating the digestion of fat and protein. Cholecystokinin, formerly called pancreozymin, is synthesized and secreted by enteroendocrine cells in the duodenum, the first segment of the small intestine. Its presence causes the release of pancreatic juice from the pancreas and bile from the gallbladder.

== History ==
Evidence that the small intestine controls the release of bile was uncovered as early as 1856, when French physiologist Claude Bernard showed that when dilute acetic acid was applied to the orifice of the bile duct, the duct released bile into the duodenum. In 1903, the French physiologist Émile Wertheimer showed that this reflex was not mediated by the nervous system. In 1904, the French physiologist Charles Fleig showed that the discharge of bile was mediated by a substance that was conveyed by the blood. There remained the possibility that the increased flow of bile in response to the presence of acid in the duodenum might be due to secretin, which had been discovered in 1902. The problem was finally resolved in 1928 by Andrew Conway Ivy and his colleague Eric Oldberg of the Northwestern University Medical School, who found a new hormone that caused contraction of the gall bladder and that they called "cholecystokinin". In 1943, Alan A. Harper and Henry S. Raper of the University of Manchester discovered a hormone that stimulated pancreatic enzyme secretion and that they named "pancreozymin"; however, pancreozymin was subsequently found to be cholecystokinin. Swedish biochemists Johannes Erik Jorpes and Viktor Mutt undertook the monumental task of isolating and purifying porcine cholecystokinin and then determining its amino acid sequence. They finally presented porcine cholecystokinin's amino acid sequence in 1968.

== Structure ==
Cholecystokinin is a member of the gastrin/cholecystokinin family of peptide hormones and is very similar in structure to gastrin, another gastrointestinal hormone. CCK and gastrin share the same five C-terminal amino acids. CCK is composed of varying numbers of amino acids depending on post-translational modification of the 150-amino acid precursor, preprocholecystokinin. Thus, the CCK peptide hormone exists in several forms, each identified by the number of amino acids it contains, e.g., CCK-58, CCK-33, CCK-22 and CCK-8. CCK58 assumes a helix-turn-helix configuration. Biological activity resides in the C-terminus of the peptide. Most CCK peptides have a sulfate group attached to a tyrosine located seven residues from the C-terminus (see tyrosine sulfation). This modification is crucial for the ability of CCK to activate the cholecystokinin A receptor. Nonsulfated CCK peptides also occur, which consequently cannot activate the CCK-A receptor, but their biological role remains unclear.

== Function ==
CCK plays important physiological roles both as a neuropeptide in the central nervous system and as a peptide hormone in the gut. It is the most abundant neuropeptide in the central nervous system. CCK has been researched thoroughly for its role in digestion In addition to its role in digestion, CCK is involved in regulating various behavioral phenomena, including satiety, appetite, anxiety, thermoregulation, sexual behavior, memory, and the response to drugs of abuse, particularly within the cortex and limbic regions of the brain.

=== Gastrointestinal ===
CCK is synthesized and released by enteroendocrine cells in the mucosal lining of the small intestine (mostly in the duodenum and jejunum), called I cells, neurons of the enteric nervous system, and neurons in the brain. It is released rapidly into the circulation in response to a meal. The greatest stimulator of CCK release is the presence of fatty acids and/or certain amino acids in the chyme entering the duodenum. In addition, release of CCK is stimulated by monitor peptide (released by pancreatic acinar cells), CCK-releasing protein (via paracrine signalling mediated by enterocytes in the gastric and intestinal mucosa), and acetylcholine (released by the parasympathetic nerve fibers of the vagus nerve).

Once in the circulatory system, CCK has a relatively short half-life.

==== Digestion ====
CCK mediates digestion in the small intestine by inhibiting gastric emptying. It stimulates the acinar cells of the pancreas to release a juice rich in pancreatic digestive enzymes (hence an alternate name, pancreozymin) that catalyze the digestion of fat, protein, and carbohydrates. Thus, as the levels of the substances that stimulated the release of CCK drop, the concentration of the hormone drops as well. The release of CCK is also inhibited by somatostatin and pancreatic peptide. Trypsin, a protease released by pancreatic acinar cells, hydrolyzes CCK-releasing peptide and monitor peptide, in effect turning off the additional signals to secrete CCK.

CCK also causes the increased production of hepatic bile, and stimulates the contraction of the gall bladder and the relaxation of the sphincter of Oddi (Glisson's sphincter), resulting in the delivery of bile into the duodenal part of the small intestine. Bile salts form amphipathic lipids, micelles that emulsify fats, aiding in their digestion and absorption.

Effects of cholecystokinin on the gastrointestinal tract. Cholecystokinin is secreted by I-cells in the small intestine and induces contraction of the gallbladder, relaxes the sphincter of Oddi, increases bile acid production in the liver, delays gastric emptying, and induces digestive enzyme production in the pancreas.

==== Satiety ====
As a peptide hormone, CCK mediates satiety by acting on the CCK receptors distributed widely throughout the central nervous system. The mechanism for hunger suppression is thought to be a decrease in the rate of gastric emptying. CCK also has stimulatory effects on the vagus nerve, effects that can be inhibited by capsaicin. The stimulatory effects of CCK oppose those of ghrelin, which has been shown to inhibit the vagus nerve.

The effects of CCK vary between individuals. For example, in rats, CCK administration significantly reduces hunger in adult males, but is slightly less effective in younger subjects, and even slightly less effective in females. The hunger-suppressive effects of CCK also are reduced in obese rats.

=== Neurological ===
CCK is found extensively throughout the central nervous system, with high concentrations found in the limbic system. CCK is synthesized as a 115 amino acid preprohormone, that is then converted into multiple isoforms. The predominant form of CCK in the central nervous system is the sulfated octapeptide, CCK-8S.

==== Anxiogenic ====
In both humans and rodents, studies clearly indicate that elevated CCK levels causes increased anxiety. The site of the anxiety-inducing effects of CCK seems to be central with specific targets being the basolateral amygdala, hippocampus, hypothalamus, periaqueductal grey, and cortical regions.

==== Panicogenic ====
The CCK tetrapeptide fragment CCK-4 (Trp-Met-Asp-Phe-NH_{2}) reliably causes anxiety and panic attacks (panicogenic effect) when administered to humans and is commonly used in scientific research in order to test new anxiolytic drugs. Positron emission tomography visualization of regional cerebral blood flow in patients undergoing CCK-4 induced panic attacks show changes in the anterior cingulate gyrus, the claustrum-insular-amygdala region, and cerebellar vermis.

==== Hallucinogenic ====
Several studies have implicated CCK as a cause of visual hallucinations in Parkinson's disease. Mutations in CCK receptors in combination with mutated CCK genes potentiate this association. These studies also uncovered potential racial/ethnic differences in the distribution of mutated CCK genes.

== Interactions ==
CCK has been shown to interact with the cholecystokinin A receptor located mainly on pancreatic acinar cells and cholecystokinin B receptor mostly in the brain and stomach. CCK_{B} receptor also binds gastrin, a gastrointestinal hormone involved in stimulating gastric acid release and growth of the gastric mucosa. CCK has also been shown to interact with calcineurin in the pancreas. Calcineurin will go on to activate the transcription factors NFAT 1–3, which will stimulate hypertrophy and growth of the pancreas. CCK can be stimulated by a diet high in protein, or by protease inhibitors. CCK has been shown to interact with orexin neurons, which control appetite and wakefulness (sleep). CCK can have indirect effects on sleep regulation.

CCK in the body cannot cross the blood–brain barrier, but certain parts of the hypothalamus and brainstem are not protected by the barrier.

== See also ==
- Antianalgesia
- Cholecystokinin antagonist
- Proglumide
