= Lorglumide =

Chemical compound

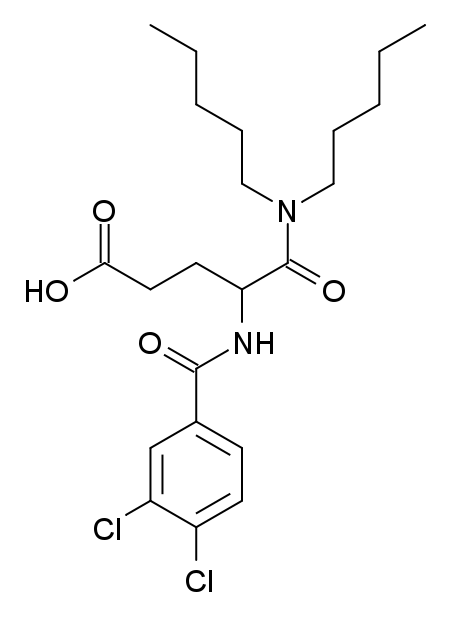

Clinical data
- Other names: 4-[(3,4-dichlorobenzoyl)amino]-5-(dipentylamino)-5-oxopentanoic acid
- ATC code: none

Identifiers
- IUPAC name: N^{2}-(3,4-Dichlorobenzoyl-N,N-dipentyl-α-glutamine
- CAS Number: 97964-56-2
- PubChem CID: 3960
- IUPHAR/BPS: 891
- ChemSpider: 3823
- UNII: LAD1UQ73BE
- ChEBI: CHEBI:88305
- ChEMBL: ChEMBL24938
- CompTox Dashboard (EPA): DTXSID2046961

Chemical and physical data
- Formula: C_{22}H_{32}Cl_{2}N_{2}O_{4}
- Molar mass: 459.41 g·mol^{−1}
- 3D model (JSmol): Interactive image
- SMILES: CCCCCN(CCCCC)C(=O)C(CCC(=O)O)NC(=O)C1=CC(=C(C=C1)Cl)Cl
- InChI: InChI=1S/C22H32Cl2N2O4/c1-3-5-7-13-26(14-8-6-4-2)22(30)19(11-12-20(27)28)25-21(29)16-9-10-17(23)18(24)15-16/h9-10,15,19H,3-8,11-14H2,1-2H3,(H,25,29)(H,27,28); Key:IEKOTSCYBBDIJC-UHFFFAOYSA-N

Lorglumide (CR-1409) is a drug which inhibits gastrointestinal motility and reduces gastric secretions, acting as a cholecystokinin antagonist, with fairly high selectivity for the CCK_{A} subtype. It has been suggested as a potential treatment for a variety of gastrointestinal problems including stomach ulcers, irritable bowel syndrome, dyspepsia, constipation and pancreatitis, as well as some forms of cancer, but animal and human testing has produced inconsistent results and no clear therapeutic role has been established, although it is widely used in scientific research.
