= Betazole =

Gastrointestinal system drug

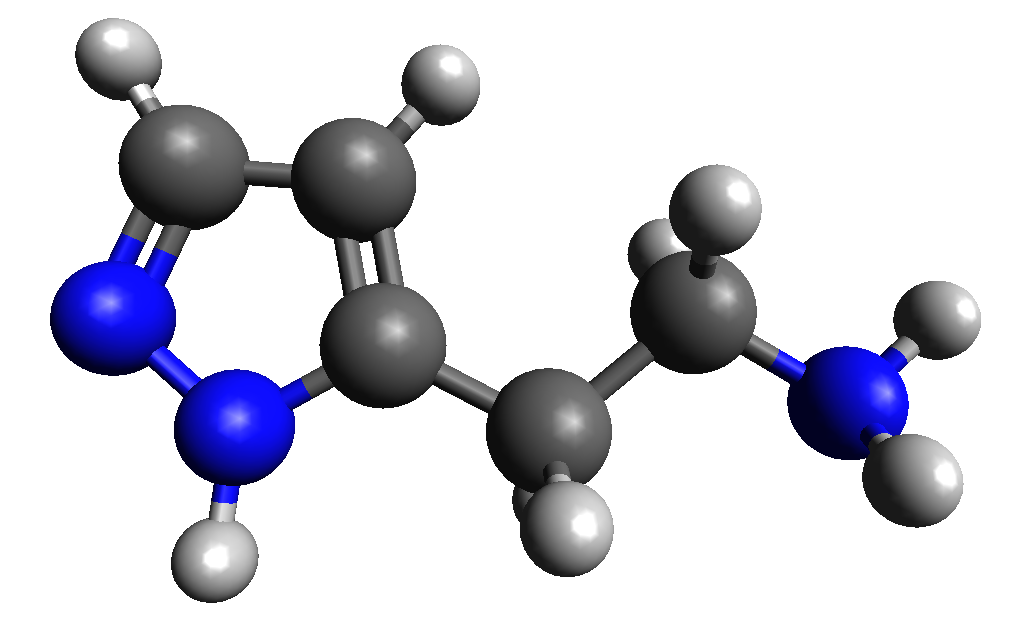

Names
- IUPAC name 2-(1H-Pyrazol-5-yl)ethan-1-amine

Identifiers
CAS Number	105-20-4
3D model (JSmol)	Interactive image
ChEBI	CHEBI:59170
ChEMBL	ChEMBL1201323
ChemSpider	7455
DrugBank	DB00272
ECHA InfoCard	100.002.981
IUPHAR/BPS	7126
PubChem CID	7741
UNII	1C065P542O
CompTox Dashboard (EPA)	DTXSID7022675
- InChI: InChI=1S/C5H9N3/c6-3-1-5-2-4-7-8-5/h2,4H,1,3,6H2,(H,7,8) Key: JXDFEQONERDKSS-UHFFFAOYSA-N; InChI=1/C5H9N3/c6-3-1-5-2-4-7-8-5/h2,4H,1,3,6H2,(H,7,8) Key: JXDFEQONERDKSS-UHFFFAOYAY
- SMILES: n1ccc([nH]1)CCN

Properties
Chemical formula	C_{5}H_{9}N_{3}
Molar mass	111.145 g/mol

Pharmacology
ATC code	V04CG02 (WHO)
- Except where otherwise noted, data are given for materials in their standard state (at 25 °C [77 °F], 100 kPa). verify (what is ?) Infobox references

Betazole (also known as ametazole) is a histamine H_{2} receptor agonist. Betazole hydrochloride is known as gastramine and histalog.

It has been used as a gastric stimulant to test for maximal production of gastric secretion activity. The test can be used in diagnosis of diseases such as Zollinger-Ellison syndrome where there is excess acid production, in this case driven by over production of gastrin. The volume of acid secretion is measured following administration of betazole, diagnosis being secretion greater than 60% of the maximal acid secretion following betazole stimulation. This procedure can lead to complications and should be avoided in subjects with coronary artery disease. It is also used in diagnosis of gastritis in association with a test for secretin activity.

Betazole is used as a stimulant in preference to histamine because of its specificity for the H_{2} receptor and its advantage of not generating the undesirable side effects that histamine would induce. It therefore does not require concomitant use of antihistaminic compounds to block the actions of histamine at other histamine receptor types.

It is used to test the effectiveness of H_{2} receptor blocking drugs such as nizatidine.
