= Proglumide =

Chemical compound

Clinical data
- Trade names: Milid
- Other names: (RS)-N^{2}-benzoyl-N,N-dipropyl-α-glutamine
- AHFS/Drugs.com: International Drug Names
- Routes of administration: By mouth
- ATC code: A02BX06 (WHO)

Legal status
- Legal status: In general: ℞ (Prescription only)

Pharmacokinetic data
- Elimination half-life: ~24 hours

Identifiers
- IUPAC name: 4-Benzamido-5-(dipropylamino)-5-oxopentanoic acid
- CAS Number: 6620-60-6
- PubChem CID: 4922
- IUPHAR/BPS: 893
- ChemSpider: 4753
- UNII: EPL8W5565D
- ChEBI: CHEBI:32058
- ChEMBL: ChEMBL316561
- CompTox Dashboard (EPA): DTXSID7023516
- ECHA InfoCard: 100.026.880

Chemical and physical data
- Formula: C_{18}H_{26}N_{2}O_{4}
- Molar mass: 334.416 g·mol^{−1}
- 3D model (JSmol): Interactive image
- SMILES: CCCN(CCC)C(=O)C(CCC(=O)O)NC(=O)c1ccccc1
- InChI: InChI=1S/C18H26N2O4/c1-3-12-20(13-4-2)18(24)15(10-11-16(21)22)19-17(23)14-8-6-5-7-9-14/h5-9,15H,3-4,10-13H2,1-2H3,(H,19,23)(H,21,22); Key:DGMKFQYCZXERLX-UHFFFAOYSA-N

Proglumide, sold under the brand name Milid, is a drug that inhibits gastrointestinal motility and reduces gastric secretions. It acts as a cholecystokinin antagonist, which blocks both the CCK_{A} and CCK_{B} subtypes. It was used mainly in the treatment of stomach ulcers, although it has now been largely replaced by newer drugs for this application.

An interesting side effect of proglumide is that it enhances the analgesia produced by opioid drugs, and can prevent or even reverse the development of tolerance to opioid drugs. This can make it a useful adjuvant treatment to use alongside opioid drugs in the treatment of chronic pain conditions such as cancer, where opioid analgesics may be required for long periods and development of tolerance reduces clinical efficacy of these drugs.

Proglumide has also been shown to act as a δ-opioid receptor (DOR) agonist, which may contribute to its analgesic effects. However, other studies show that proglumide has low affinity to the μ-opioid receptor (MOR) and the κ-opioid receptor (KOR) (13% of MOR and 17% of KOR occupancy at 100 μM), but no affinity to DOR. It is questionable whether this is clinically significant, since the concentration they used was very high, and the occupancies were low even at that point.

Proglumide also works as a placebo effect amplifier for pain conditions. When injected visibly to a subject, its analgesic effect is bigger than a similarly administered placebo. When injected secretly, it does not have any effect, whereas standard pain drugs have an effect, even if they are administered without the subject's awareness. The supposed mechanism is an enhancement of the neural pathways of expectation as a result of dopamine and endogenous opioids being suddenly released throughout numerous structures of the brain and spinal cord.

The ventral tegmental area is the structure believed to mediate proglumide's analgesic and euphoric effects, however dozens of areas with a wide range of physical and psychological functions are implicated in the mediation of the placebo effect (this accounts for proglumide's ability to produce physically measurable effects on vital signs such as heart rate, blood pressure, respiration rate, and tidal volume which cannot be accounted for by its clinically insignificant δ-opioid affinity.

== See also ==
- Proglumetacin
- Benzotript
