= Cholecystokinin antagonist =

Drug which blocks the effects of cholecystokinin

A cholecystokinin receptor antagonist is a specific type of receptor antagonist which blocks the receptor sites for the peptide hormone cholecystokinin (CCK).

== Classification ==
There are two subtypes of this receptor known at present, defined as CCK_{A} and CCK_{B} (also called CCK-1 and CCK-2, respectively). The CCK_{A} receptor is mainly expressed in the small intestine, and is involved in the regulation of enzyme secretion by the pancreas, secretion of gastric acid in the stomach, intestinal motility and signaling of satiety (fullness). The CCK_{B} receptor is expressed mainly in the central nervous system, and has functions relating to anxiety and the perception of pain. Antagonists for the CCK receptors can thus have multiple functions in both the gut and brain.

== Research ==
The best known CCK receptor antagonist is the non-selective antagonist proglumide, which blocks both CCK_{A} and CCK_{B} receptors, and was originally developed for the treatment of stomach ulcers. This action derived from its blockade of CCK_{A} receptor in the gut and consequent reduction in secretion of gastric acid, however a side effect of proglumide was found, namely that it increases the analgesic effects of opioid painkillers, and decreases the development of tolerance. This was subsequently found to result from its blockade of CCK_{B} receptors in the brain. Another CCK receptor antagonist is benzotript, which is likewise non-selective.

Newer drugs have since been developed which are selective for one or other of the CCK receptors. Selective CCK_{A} receptor antagonists such as lorglumide and devazepide have been developed both for their anti-ulcer effects and as potential drugs to limit the development of gastrointestinal cancers such as colon cancer. A centrally selective antagonist—Ranquilon—has recently undergone clinical approval for the treatment of anxiety in Russia.

The main focus of CCK receptor antagonist research has focused on the development of selective CCK_{B} receptor antagonists as novel medications which have been primarily investigated for the treatment of anxiety and panic attacks, as well as for other roles such as analgesic effects. The first selective CCK_{B} receptor antagonists were modified peptide molecules such as CI-988 and the more metabolically stable CI-1015, however these were disadvantaged by only being able to be administered by injection and rapid breakdown inside the body, which led to a short half-life and limited utility. Non-peptide CCK_{B} receptor antagonists such as L-365,260, L-369,293, YF-476, RP-69758, LY-288,513, PD-145,942 and the CCK_{B} receptor inverse agonist L-740,093 have since been developed, and while all of the drugs developed so far have suffered from limited bioavailability or other issues which have hindered their clinical development, research in this area continues.

CCK_{A} receptors are also expressed in the brain to some extent, and IQM-95333, an antagonist selective for this population of CCK_{A} receptors, was also found to reduce anxiety in animal models. Conversely, inhibition of CCK_{B} receptors in the gut produces similar inhibition of secretion of gastric acid and pepsinogen enzymes as is seen with inhibition of CCK_{A} receptors, suggesting that while the CCK_{A} and CCK_{B} receptors comprise two structurally distinct families which bind different ligands and are primarily expressed in different tissues, they produce similar effects, and the distinction between their gastrointestinal and anxiolytic actions depends mainly on where they are expressed in the body.
