= Devazepide =

Chemical compound

Clinical data
- ATC code: none

Identifiers
- IUPAC name: N-(1-methyl-2-oxo-5-phenyl-3H-1,4-benzodiazepin-3-yl)-1H-indole-2-carboxamide
- CAS Number: 103420-77-5
- PubChem CID: 443375
- IUPHAR/BPS: 878
- ChemSpider: 391607
- UNII: JE6P7QY7NH
- KEGG: D02693
- ChEMBL: ChEMBL9506
- CompTox Dashboard (EPA): DTXSID2046092
- ECHA InfoCard: 100.208.547

Chemical and physical data
- Formula: C_{25}H_{20}N_{4}O_{2}
- Molar mass: 408.461 g·mol^{−1}
- 3D model (JSmol): Interactive image
- SMILES: O=C(c2cc1ccccc1[nH]2)N[C@H]3/N=C(\c4ccccc4N(C3=O)C)c5ccccc5
- InChI: InChI=1S/C25H20N4O2/c1-29-21-14-8-6-12-18(21)22(16-9-3-2-4-10-16)27-23(25(29)31)28-24(30)20-15-17-11-5-7-13-19(17)26-20/h2-15,23,26H,1H3,(H,28,30)/t23-/m1/s1; Key:NFHRQQKPEBFUJK-HSZRJFAPSA-N

Devazepide (L-364,718, MK-329) is benzodiazepine drug, but with quite different actions from most benzodiazepines, lacking affinity for GABA_{A} receptors and instead acting as an CCK_{A} receptor antagonist. It increases appetite and accelerates gastric emptying, and has been suggested as a potential treatment for a variety of common gastrointestinal problems including dyspepsia, gastroparesis and gastric reflux. It is also widely used in scientific research into the CCK_{A} receptor.

== Synthesis ==
Devazepide is synthesised in a similar manner to other benzodiazepines such as lorazepam.

== See also ==
- Benzodiazepine
- Cholecystokinin antagonist
