= CCK-4 =

Anxiogenic agent

Clinical data
- Other names: Tetragastrin; Cholecystokinin tetrapeptide
- Routes of administration: Intravenous
- ATC code: None

Pharmacokinetic data
- Bioavailability: 100%
- Metabolism: Plasma protease enzymes
- Elimination half-life: 13 minutes
- Excretion: N/A

Identifiers
- IUPAC name: (3S)-3-[(2S)-2-amino-3-phenylpropanamido]-3-{[(1S)-1-{[(1S)-1-carboxy -2-(indol-3-yl)ethyl]carbamoyl}-3-(methylsulfanyl)propyl]carbamoyl}propanoic acid
- CAS Number: 1947-37-1
- PubChem CID: 446569
- ChemSpider: 393888
- UNII: 0OL293AV80
- ChEBI: CHEBI:137728
- CompTox Dashboard (EPA): DTXSID601027522

Chemical and physical data
- Formula: C_{29}H_{35}N_{5}O_{7}S
- Molar mass: 597.69 g·mol^{−1}
- 3D model (JSmol): Interactive image
- SMILES: CSCC[C@@H](C(=O)N[C@@H](CC(=O)O)C(=O)N[C@@H](Cc1ccccc1)C(=O)N)NC(=O)[C@H](Cc2c[nH]c3c2cccc3)N
- InChI: InChI=1S/C29H36N6O6S/c1-42-12-11-22(33-27(39)20(30)14-18-16-32-21-10-6-5-9-19(18)21)28(40)35-24(15-25(36)37)29(41)34-23(26(31)38)13-17-7-3-2-4-8-17/h2-10,16,20,22-24,32H,11-15,30H2,1H3,(H2,31,38)(H,33,39)(H,34,41)(H,35,40)(H,36,37)/t20-,22-,23-,24-/m0/s1; Key:RGYLYUZOGHTBRF-BIHRQFPBSA-N

Cholecystokinin tetrapeptide (CCK-4, tetragastrin, Trp-Met-Asp-Phe-NH_{2}) is a peptide fragment derived from the larger peptide hormone cholecystokinin. Unlike cholecystokin, which has a variety of roles in the gastrointestinal system as well as central nervous system effects, CCK-4 acts primarily in the brain as an anxiogenic, although it does retain some GI effects, but not as much as CCK-8 or the full length polypeptide CCK-58.

CCK-4 reliably causes severe anxiety symptoms when administered to humans in a dose of as little as 50 μg, and is commonly used in scientific research to induce panic attacks for the purpose of testing new anxiolytic drugs. Since it is a peptide, CCK-4 must be administered by injection, and is rapidly broken down once inside the body so has only a short duration of action, although numerous synthetic analogues with modified properties are known.

== See also ==
- Pentagastrin
