= Human digestive system =

Digestive system in humans

- Human digestive system

Details

Identifiers
- Latin: systema digestorium
- MeSH: D004064
- TA98: A05.0.00.000
- TA2: 2773
- TH: H3.04
- FMA: 7152

The human digestive system consists of the gastrointestinal tract plus the accessory organs of digestion (the tongue, salivary glands, pancreas, liver, and gallbladder). Digestion involves the breakdown of food into smaller and smaller components, until they can be absorbed and assimilated into the body. The process of digestion has three stages: the cephalic phase, the gastric phase, and the intestinal phase.

The first stage, the cephalic phase of digestion, begins with secretions from gastric glands in response to the sight and smell of food, and continues in the mouth with the mechanical breakdown of food by chewing, and the chemical breakdown by digestive enzymes in the saliva. Saliva contains amylase, and lingual lipase, secreted by the salivary glands, and serous glands on the tongue. Chewing mixes the food with saliva to produce a food bolus to be swallowed down the esophagus to enter the stomach. The second stage, the gastric phase, takes place in the stomach, where the food is further broken down by mixing with gastric juice until it passes into the duodenum, the first part of the small intestine. The intestinal phase where the partially digested food is mixed with pancreatic digestive enzymes completes the process of digestion.

Digestion is helped by the chewing of food carried out by the muscles of mastication, the tongue, and the teeth, and also by the contractions of peristalsis, and segmentation. Gastric juice containing gastric acid, and the production of mucus in the stomach, are essential for the continuation of digestion.

Peristalsis is the rhythmic contraction of muscles that begins in the esophagus and continues along the wall of the stomach and the rest of the gastrointestinal tract. This initially results in the production of chyme which when fully broken down in the small intestine is absorbed as chyle into the lymphatic system. Most of the digestion of food takes place in the small intestine. Water and some minerals are reabsorbed back into the blood in the large intestine. The waste products of digestion (feces) are excreted from the rectum via the anus.

== Components ==
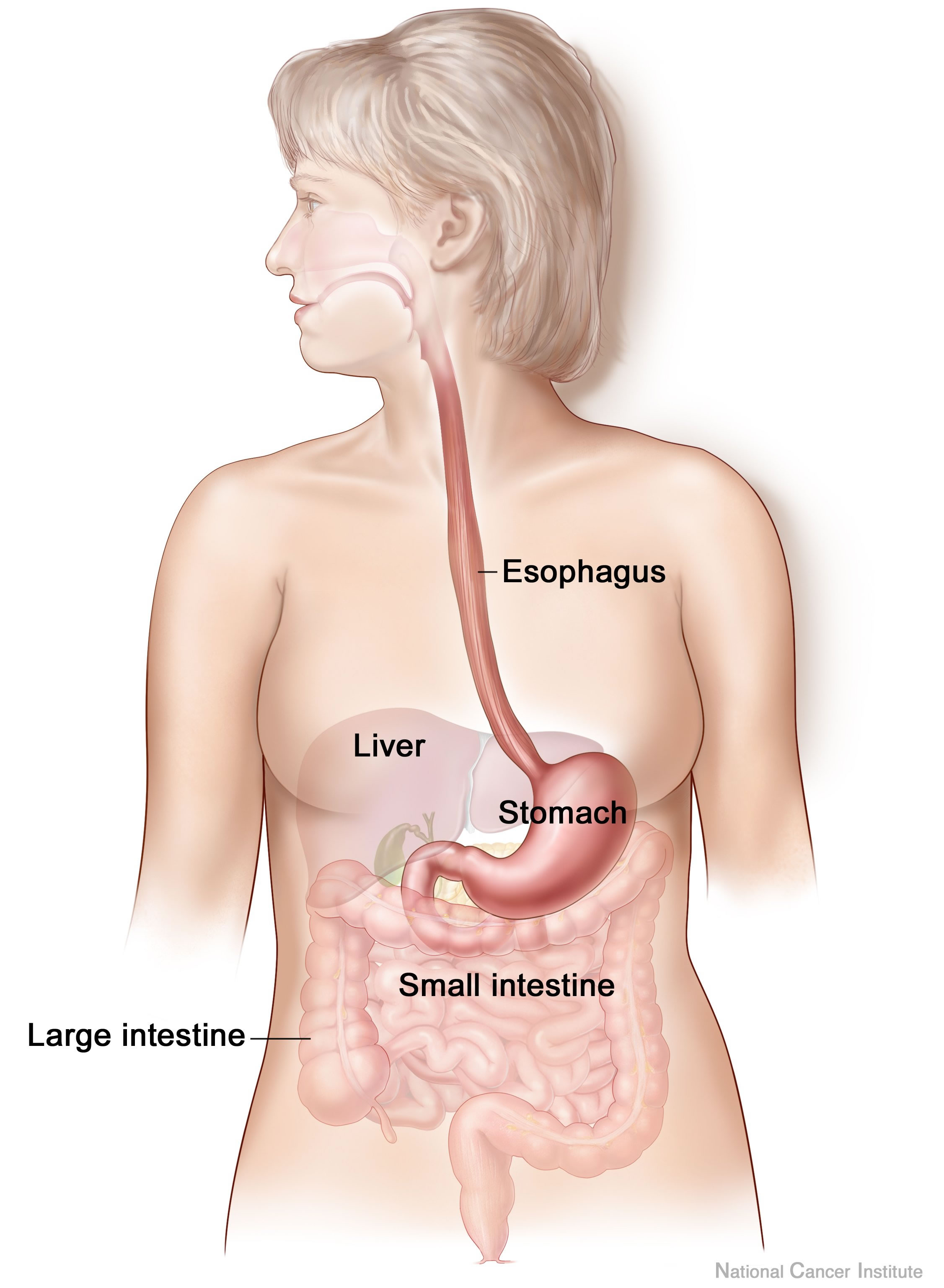
Adult digestive system

There are several organs involved in the digestion of food. The organs that are outside of the gastrointestinal tract (GI tract) but associated with digestion, are known as the accessory digestive organs and include the mouth, and tongue, and glandular organs – the salivary glands, the liver, gall bladder and pancreas. Other components considered are the teeth and epiglottis. A number of sphincters in the GI tract are also involved in digestion, including those of the esophagus (esophageal sphincters) and stomach (pyloric sphincter).

The largest structure of the digestive system is the GI tract. This starts at the mouth and ends at the anus, covering a distance of about nine metres (30 ft).

A major digestive organ is the stomach. Within its mucosa are millions of embedded gastric glands. Their secretions as gastric juice are vital to the functioning of the organ.

Most of the digestion of food takes place in the small intestine, which is responsible for chemical digestion and the absorption of water and nutrients into the bloodstream. It is followed by the large intestine, which further absorbs water and electrolytes from digestive contents, and stores the remaining waste matter (faeces) until it is expelled through defecation. The small intestine is the longest part of the GI tract but has a smaller diameter than the large intestine.

There are many specialised cells of the GI tract. These include the taste receptors, various cells of the gastric glands, centroacinar cells of the pancreas, enterocytes lining the intestinal epithelium, and microfold cells also known as mucosal cells, mainly found in gut-associated lymphoid tissue of the small intestine.

Some parts of the digestive system are also part of the excretory system, including the large intestine.

=== Mouth ===
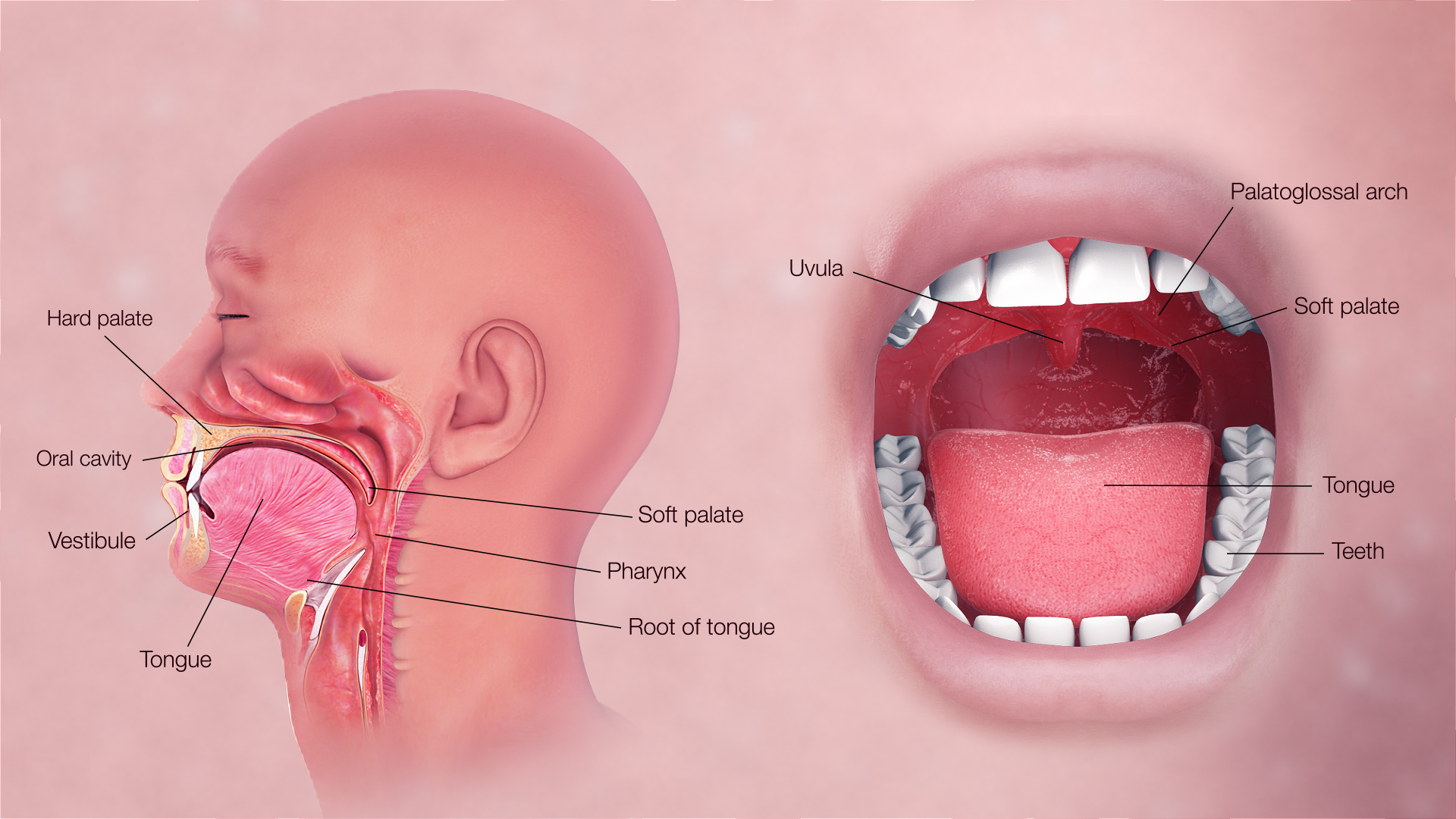
3D medical illustration explaining the oral digestive system

The mouth is the first part of the upper gastrointestinal tract and is equipped with several structures that begin the first processes of digestion. These include salivary glands, teeth and the tongue. The mouth consists of two regions; the vestibule and the oral cavity proper. The vestibule is the area between the teeth, lips and cheeks, and the rest is the oral cavity proper. Most of the oral cavity is lined with oral mucosa, a mucous membrane that produces a lubricating mucus, of which only a small amount is needed. Mucous membranes vary in structure in the different regions of the body but they all produce a lubricating mucus, which is either secreted by surface cells or more usually by underlying glands. The mucous membrane in the mouth continues as the thin mucosa which lines the bases of the teeth. The main component of mucus is a glycoprotein called mucin and the type secreted varies according to the region involved. Mucin is viscous, clear, and clinging. Underlying the mucous membrane in the mouth is a thin layer of smooth muscle tissue and the loose connection to the membrane gives it its great elasticity. It covers the cheeks, inner surfaces of the lips, and floor of the mouth, and the mucin produced is highly protective against tooth decay.

The roof of the mouth is termed the palate and it separates the oral cavity from the nasal cavity. The palate is hard at the front of the mouth since the overlying mucosa is covering a plate of bone; it is softer and more pliable at the back being made of muscle and connective tissue, and it can move to swallow food and liquids. The soft palate ends at the uvula. The surface of the hard palate allows for the pressure needed in eating food, to leave the nasal passage clear. The opening between the lips is termed the oral fissure, and the opening into the throat is called the fauces.

At either side of the soft palate are the palatoglossus muscles which also reach into regions of the tongue. These muscles raise the back of the tongue and also close both sides of the fauces to enable food to be swallowed. Mucus helps in the mastication of food in its ability to soften and collect the food in the formation of the bolus.

==== Salivary glands ====
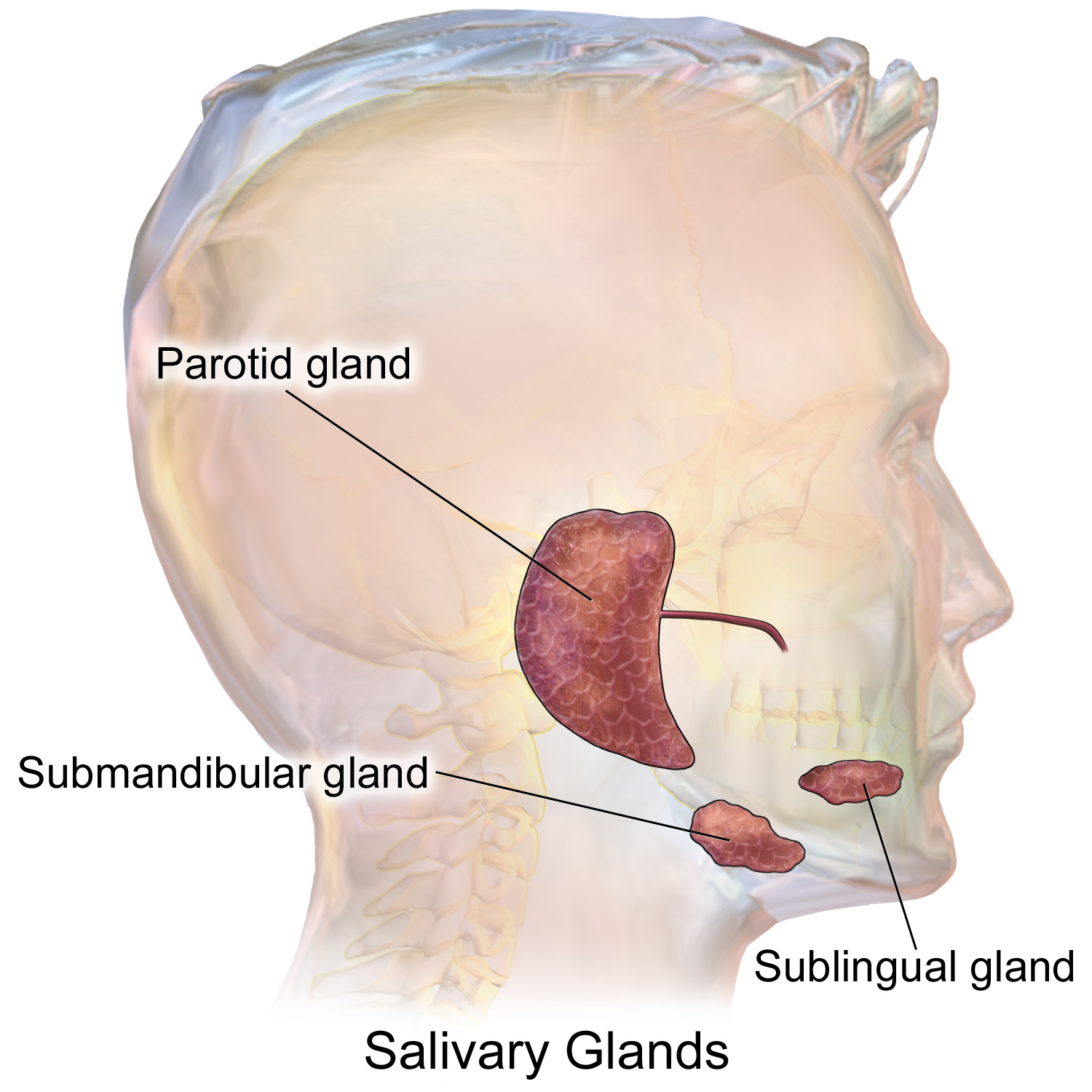
The main salivary glands

There are three pairs of main salivary glands and between 800 and 1,000 minor salivary glands, all of which mainly serve the digestive process, and also play an important role in the maintenance of dental health and general mouth lubrication, without which speech would be impossible. The main glands are all exocrine glands, secreting via ducts. All of these glands terminate in the mouth. The largest of these are the parotid glands—their secretion is mainly serous. The next pair are underneath the jaw, the submandibular glands, these produce both serous fluid and mucus. The serous fluid is produced by serous glands in these salivary glands which also produce lingual lipase. They produce about 70% of the oral cavity saliva. The third pair are the sublingual glands located underneath the tongue and their secretion is mainly mucous with a small percentage of saliva.

Within the oral mucosa, and also on the tongue, palates, and floor of the mouth, are the minor salivary glands; their secretions are mainly mucous and they are innervated by the facial nerve (CN7). The glands also secrete amylase a first stage in the breakdown of food acting on the carbohydrate in the food to transform the starch content into maltose. There are other serous glands on the surface of the tongue that encircle taste buds on the back part of the tongue and these also produce lingual lipase. Lipase is a digestive enzyme that catalyses the hydrolysis of lipids (fats). These glands are termed Von Ebner's glands which have also been shown to have another function in the secretion of histatins which offer an early defense (outside of the immune system) against microbes in food, when it makes contact with these glands on the tongue tissue. Sensory information can stimulate the secretion of saliva providing the necessary fluid for the tongue to work with and also to ease swallowing of the food.

===== Saliva =====
Saliva moistens and softens food, and along with the chewing action of the teeth, transforms the food into a smooth bolus. The bolus is further helped by the lubrication provided by the saliva in its passage from the mouth into the esophagus. Also of importance is the presence in saliva of the digestive enzymes amylase and lipase. Amylase starts to work on the starch in carbohydrates, breaking it down into the simple sugars of maltose and dextrose that can be further broken down in the small intestine. Saliva in the mouth can account for 30% of this initial starch digestion. Lipase starts to work on breaking down fats. Lipase is further produced in the pancreas where it is released to continue this digestion of fats. The presence of salivary lipase is of prime importance in young babies whose pancreatic lipase has yet to be developed.

As well as its role in supplying digestive enzymes, saliva has a cleansing action for the teeth and mouth. It also has an immunological role in supplying antibodies to the system, such as immunoglobulin A. This is seen to be key in preventing infections of the salivary glands, importantly that of parotitis.

Saliva also contains a glycoprotein called haptocorrin which is a binding protein to vitamin B_{12}. It binds with the vitamin in order to carry it safely through the acidic content of the stomach. When it reaches the duodenum, pancreatic enzymes break down the glycoprotein and free the vitamin which then binds with intrinsic factor.

==== Tongue ====
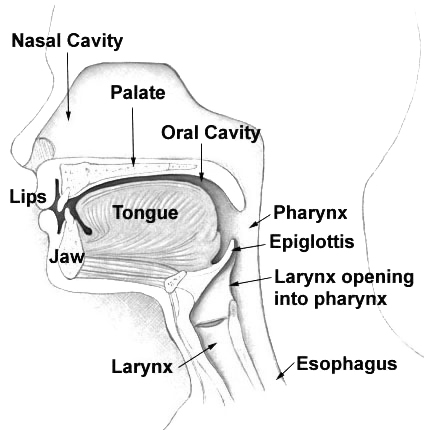

Food enters the mouth where the first stage in the digestive process takes place, with the action of the tongue and the secretion of saliva. The tongue is a fleshy and muscular sensory organ, and the first sensory information is received via the taste buds in the papillae on its surface. If the taste is agreeable, the tongue will go into action, manipulating the food in the mouth which stimulates the secretion of saliva from the salivary glands. The liquid quality of the saliva will help in the softening of the food and its enzyme content will start to break down the food whilst it is still in the mouth. The first part of the food to be broken down is the starch of carbohydrates (by the enzyme amylase in the saliva).

The tongue is attached to the floor of the mouth by a ligamentous band called the frenum and this gives it great mobility for the manipulation of food (and speech); the range of manipulation is optimally controlled by the action of several muscles and limited in its external range by the stretch of the frenum. The tongue's two sets of muscles, are four intrinsic muscles that originate in the tongue and are involved with its shaping, and four extrinsic muscles originating in bone that are involved with its movement.

===== Taste =====
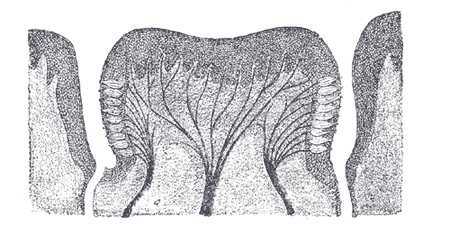
Cross section of circumvallate papilla showing arrangement of nerves and taste buds

Taste is a form of chemoreception that takes place in the specialised taste receptors, contained in structures called taste buds in the mouth. Taste buds are mainly on the upper surface (dorsum) of the tongue. The function of taste perception is vital to help prevent harmful or rotten foods from being consumed. There are also taste buds on the epiglottis and upper part of the esophagus. The taste buds are innervated by a branch of the facial nerve the chorda tympani, and the glossopharyngeal nerve. Taste messages are sent via these cranial nerves to the brain. The brain can distinguish between the chemical qualities of the food. The five basic tastes are referred to as those of saltiness, sourness, bitterness, sweetness, and umami. The detection of saltiness and sourness enables the control of salt and acid balance. The detection of bitterness warns of poisons—many of a plant's defences are of poisonous compounds that are bitter. Sweetness guides to those foods that will supply energy; the initial breakdown of the energy-giving carbohydrates by salivary amylase creates the taste of sweetness since simple sugars are the first result. The taste of umami is thought to signal protein-rich food. Sour tastes are acidic which is often found in bad food. The brain has to decide very quickly whether the food should be eaten or not. It was the findings in 1991, describing the first olfactory receptors that helped to prompt the research into taste. The olfactory receptors are located on cell surfaces in the nose which bind to chemicals enabling the detection of smells. It is assumed that signals from taste receptors work together with those from the nose, to form an idea of complex food flavours.

==== Teeth ====
Teeth are complex structures made of materials specific to them. They are made of a bone-like material called dentin, which is covered by the hardest tissue in the body—enamel. Teeth have different shapes to deal with different aspects of mastication employed in tearing and chewing pieces of food into smaller and smaller pieces. This results in a much larger surface area for the action of digestive enzymes. The teeth are named after their particular roles in the process of mastication—incisors are used for cutting or biting off pieces of food; canines, are used for tearing, premolars and molars are used for chewing and grinding. Mastication of the food with the help of saliva and mucus results in the formation of a soft bolus which can then be swallowed to make its way down the upper gastrointestinal tract to the stomach. The digestive enzymes in saliva also help in keeping the teeth clean by breaking down any lodged food particles.

==== Epiglottis ====
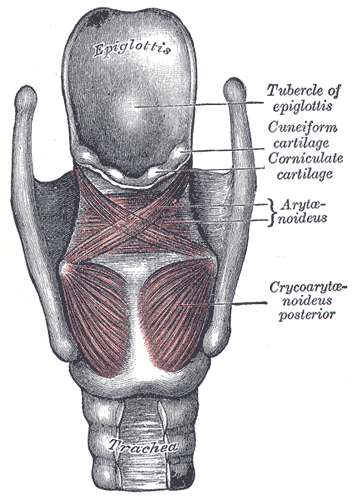

The epiglottis is a flap of elastic cartilage attached to the entrance of the larynx. It is covered with a mucous membrane and there are taste buds on its lingual surface which faces into the mouth. Its laryngeal surface faces into the larynx. The epiglottis functions to guard the entrance of the glottis, the opening between the vocal folds. It is normally pointed upward during breathing with its underside functioning as part of the pharynx, but during swallowing, the epiglottis folds down to a more horizontal position, with its upper side functioning as part of the pharynx. In this manner it prevents food from going into the trachea and instead directs it to the esophagus, which is behind. During swallowing, the backward motion of the tongue forces the epiglottis over the glottis' opening to prevent any food that is being swallowed from entering the larynx which leads to the lungs; the larynx is also pulled upwards to assist this process. Stimulation of the larynx by ingested matter produces a strong cough reflex in order to protect the lungs.

=== Pharynx ===
The pharynx is a part of the conducting zone of the respiratory system and also a part of the digestive system. It is the part of the throat immediately behind the nasal cavity at the back of the mouth and above the esophagus and larynx. The pharynx is made up of three parts. The lower two parts—the oropharynx and the laryngopharynx are involved in the digestive system. The laryngopharynx connects to the esophagus and it serves as a passageway for both air and food. Air enters the larynx anteriorly but anything swallowed has priority and the passage of air is temporarily blocked. The pharynx is innervated by the pharyngeal plexus of the vagus nerve. Muscles in the pharynx push the food into the esophagus. The pharynx joins the esophagus at the oesophageal inlet which is located behind the cricoid cartilage.

=== Esophagus ===
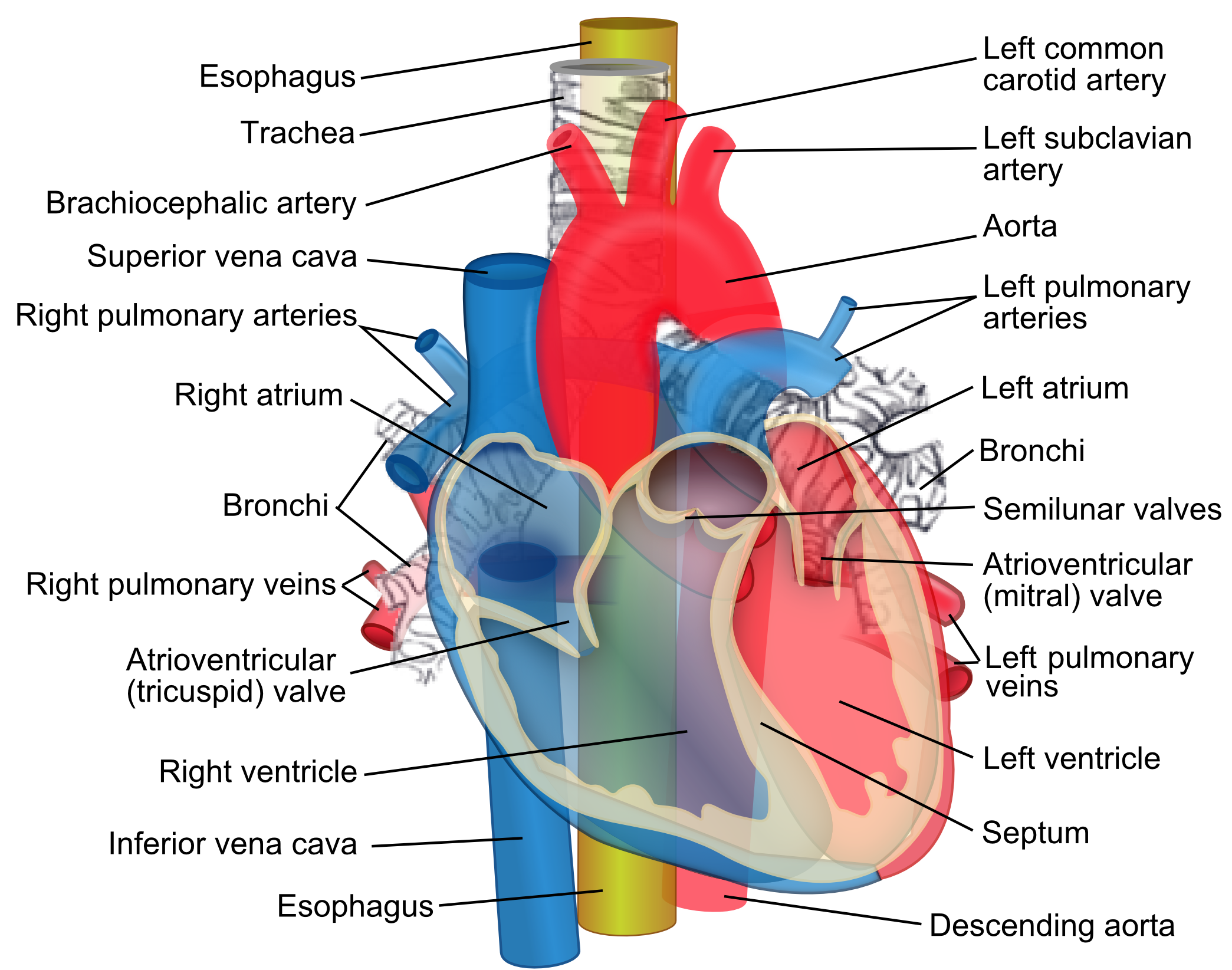
Esophagus shown in yellow passing behind the trachea and the heart

The esophagus, commonly known as the foodpipe or gullet, consists of a muscular tube through which food passes from the pharynx to the stomach. The esophagus is continuous with the laryngopharynx. It passes through the posterior mediastinum in the thorax and enters the stomach through a hole in the thoracic diaphragm—the esophageal hiatus, at the level of the tenth thoracic vertebra (T10). Its length averages 25 cm, varying with an individual's height. It is divided into cervical, thoracic and abdominal parts. The pharynx joins the esophagus at the esophageal inlet which is behind the cricoid cartilage.

At rest the esophagus is closed at both ends, by the upper and lower esophageal sphincters. The opening of the upper sphincter is triggered by the swallowing reflex so that food is allowed through. The sphincter also serves to prevent back flow from the esophagus into the pharynx. The esophagus has a mucous membrane and the epithelium which has a protective function is continuously replaced due to the volume of food that passes inside the esophagus. During swallowing, food passes from the mouth through the pharynx into the esophagus. The epiglottis folds down to a more horizontal position to direct the food into the esophagus, and away from the trachea.

Once in the esophagus, the bolus travels down to the stomach via rhythmic contraction and relaxation of muscles known as peristalsis. The lower esophageal sphincter is a muscular sphincter surrounding the lower part of the esophagus. The gastroesophageal junction between the esophagus and the stomach is controlled by the lower esophageal sphincter, which remains constricted at all times other than during swallowing and vomiting to prevent the contents of the stomach from entering the esophagus. As the esophagus does not have the same protection from acid as the stomach, any failure of this sphincter can lead to heartburn.

=== Diaphragm ===
The diaphragm is an important part of the body's digestive system. The muscular diaphragm separates the thoracic cavity from the abdominal cavity where most of the digestive organs are located. The suspensory muscle attaches the ascending duodenum to the diaphragm. This muscle is thought to be of help in the digestive system in that its attachment offers a wider angle to the duodenojejunal flexure for the easier passage of digesting material. The diaphragm also attaches to, and anchors the liver at its bare area. The esophagus enters the abdomen through a hole in the diaphragm at the level of T10.

=== Stomach ===
Areas of the stomach

The stomach is a major organ of the gastrointestinal tract and digestive system. It is a consistently J-shaped organ joined to the esophagus at its upper end and to the duodenum at its lower end. Gastric acid (informally gastric juice), produced in the stomach plays a vital role in the digestive process, and mainly contains hydrochloric acid and sodium chloride. A peptide hormone, gastrin, produced by G cells in the gastric glands, stimulates the production of gastric juice which activates the digestive enzymes. Pepsinogen is a precursor enzyme (zymogen) produced by the gastric chief cells, and gastric acid activates this to the enzyme pepsin which begins the digestion of proteins. As these two chemicals would damage the stomach wall, mucus is secreted by innumerable gastric glands in the stomach, to provide a slimy protective layer against the damaging effects of the chemicals on the inner layers of the stomach.

At the same time that protein is being digested, mechanical churning occurs through the action of peristalsis, waves of muscular contractions that move along the stomach wall. This allows the mass of food to further mix with the digestive enzymes. Gastric lipase secreted by the chief cells in the fundic glands in the gastric mucosa of the stomach, is an acidic lipase, in contrast with the alkaline pancreatic lipase. This breaks down fats to some degree though is not as efficient as the pancreatic lipase.

The pylorus, the lowest section of the stomach which attaches to the duodenum via the pyloric canal, contains countless glands which secrete digestive enzymes including gastrin. After an hour or two, a thick semi-liquid called chyme is produced. When the pyloric sphincter, or valve opens, chyme enters the duodenum where it mixes further with digestive enzymes from the pancreas, and then passes through the small intestine, where digestion continues.

The parietal cells in the fundus of the stomach, produce a glycoprotein called intrinsic factor which is essential for the absorption of vitamin B12. Vitamin B12 (cobalamin), is carried to, and through the stomach, bound to a glycoprotein secreted by the salivary glands – transcobalamin I also called haptocorrin, which protects the acid-sensitive vitamin from the acidic stomach contents. Once in the more neutral duodenum, pancreatic enzymes break down the protective glycoprotein. The freed vitamin B12 then binds to intrinsic factor which is then absorbed by the enterocytes in the ileum.

The stomach is a distensible organ and can normally expand to hold about one litre of food. This expansion is enabled by a series of gastric folds in the inner walls of the stomach. The stomach of a newborn baby will only be able to expand to retain about 30 ml.

=== Spleen ===
The spleen is the largest lymphoid organ in the body but has other functions. It breaks down both red and white blood cells that are spent. This is why it is sometimes known as the 'graveyard of red blood cells'. A product of this digestion is the pigment bilirubin, which is sent to the liver and secreted in the bile. Another product is iron, which is used in the formation of new blood cells in the bone marrow. Medicine treats the spleen solely as belonging to the lymphatic system, though it is acknowledged that the full range of its important functions is not yet understood.

=== Liver ===
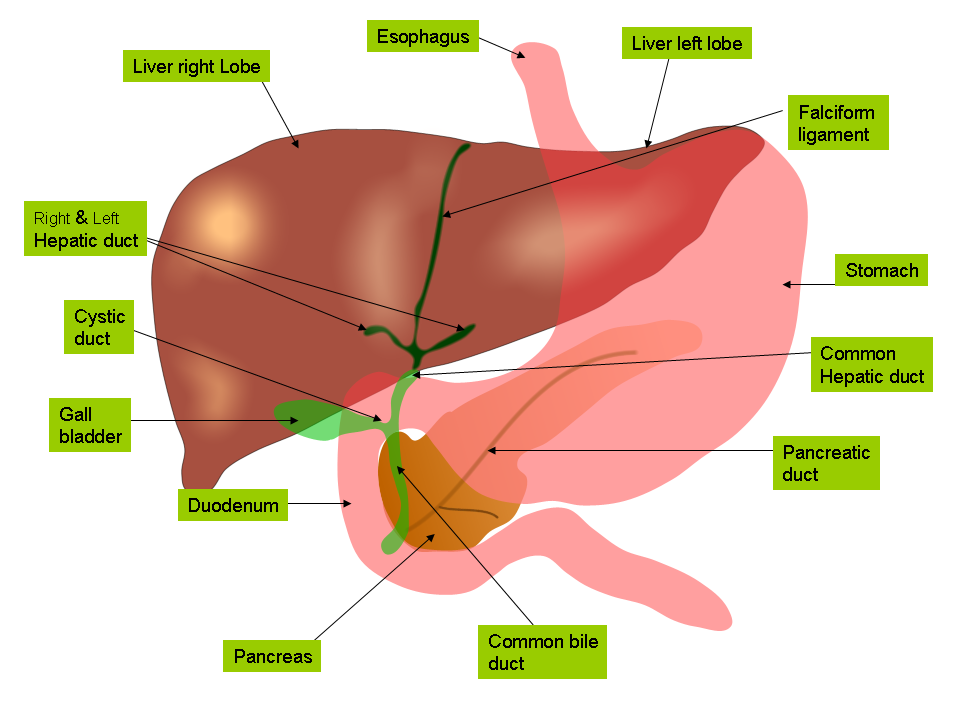
Liver and gall bladder

The liver is the second largest organ (after the skin) and is an accessory digestive gland which plays a role in the body's metabolism. The liver has many functions some of which are important to digestion. The liver can detoxify various metabolites; synthesise proteins and produce biochemicals needed for digestion. It regulates the storage of glycogen which it can form from glucose (glycogenesis). The liver can also synthesise glucose from certain amino acids. Its digestive functions are largely involved with the breaking down of carbohydrates. It also maintains protein metabolism in its synthesis and degradation. In lipid metabolism it synthesises cholesterol. Fats are also produced in the process of lipogenesis. The liver synthesises the bulk of lipoproteins. The liver is located in the upper right quadrant of the abdomen and below the diaphragm to which it is attached at one part, the bare area of the liver. This is to the right of the stomach and it overlies the gall bladder. The liver synthesises bile acids and lecithin to promote the digestion of fat.

==== Bile ====
Bile produced by the liver is made up of water (97%), bile salts, mucus and pigments, 1% fats and inorganic salts. Bilirubin is its major pigment. Bile acts partly as a surfactant which lowers the surface tension between either two liquids or a solid and a liquid and helps to emulsify the fats in the chyme. Food fat is dispersed by the action of bile into smaller units called micelles. The breaking down into micelles creates a much larger surface area for the pancreatic enzyme, lipase to work on. Lipase digests the triglycerides which are broken down into two fatty acids and a monoglyceride. These are then absorbed by villi on the intestinal wall. If fats are not absorbed in this way in the small intestine problems can arise later in the large intestine which is not equipped to absorb fats. Bile also helps in the absorption of vitamin K from the diet. Bile is collected and delivered through the common hepatic duct. This duct joins with the cystic duct to connect in a common bile duct with the gallbladder. Bile is stored in the gallbladder for release when food is discharged into the duodenum and also after a few hours.

==== Gallbladder ====
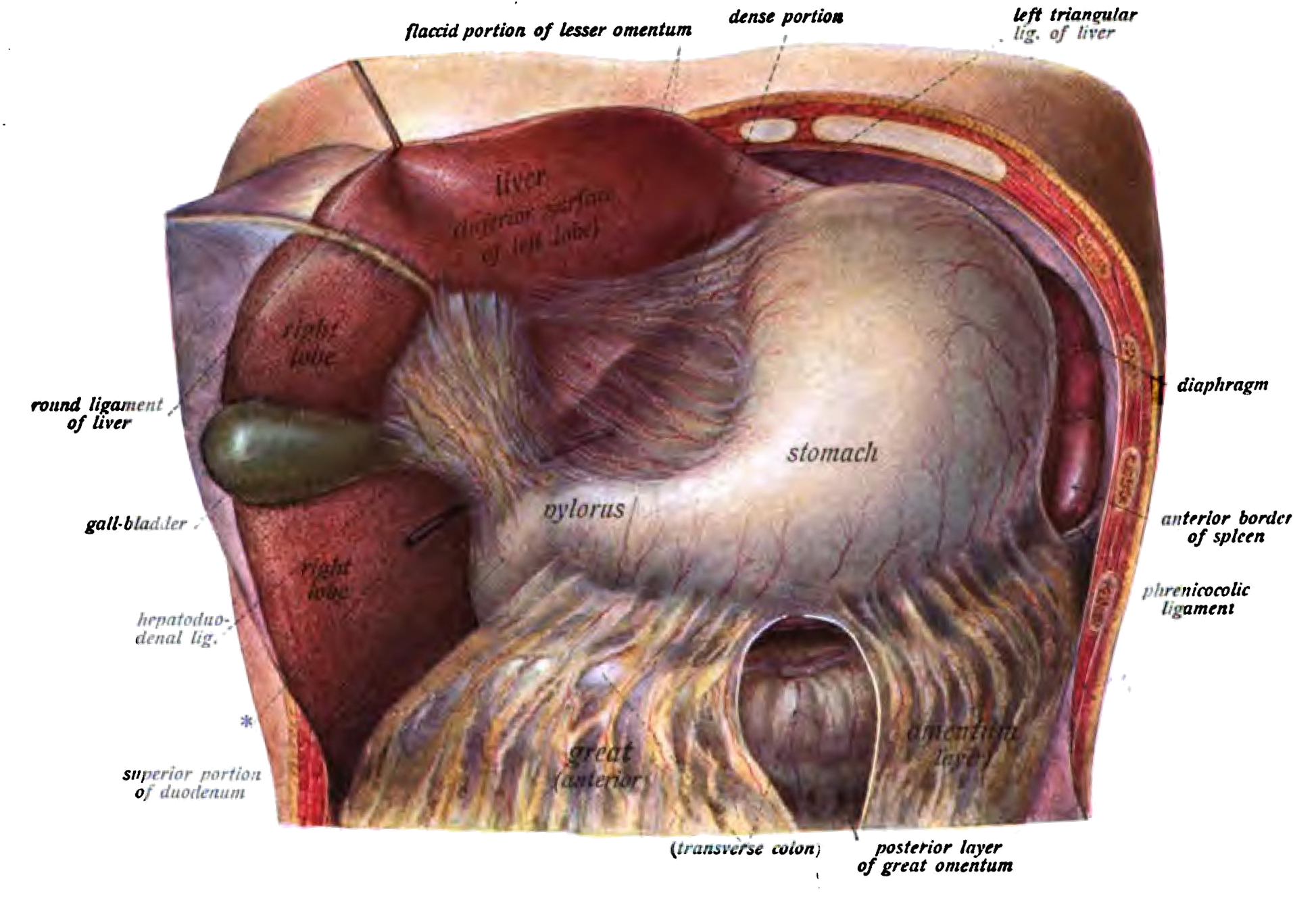
Gallbladder shown in green below the liver

The gallbladder is a hollow part of the biliary tract that sits just beneath the liver, with the gallbladder body resting in a small depression. It is a small organ where the bile produced by the liver is stored, before being released into the small intestine. Bile flows from the liver through the bile ducts and into the gall bladder for storage. The bile is released in response to cholecystokinin (CCK), a peptide hormone released from the duodenum. The production of CCK (by endocrine cells of the duodenum) is stimulated by the presence of fat in the duodenum.

It is divided into three sections, a fundus, body and neck. The neck tapers and connects to the biliary tract via the cystic duct, which then joins the common hepatic duct to form the common bile duct. At this junction is a mucosal fold called Hartmann's pouch, where gallstones commonly get stuck. The muscular layer of the body is of smooth muscle tissue that helps the gallbladder contract, so that it can discharge its bile into the bile duct. The gallbladder needs to store bile in a natural, semi-liquid form at all times. Hydrogen ions secreted from the inner lining of the gallbladder keep the bile acidic enough to prevent hardening. To dilute the bile, water and electrolytes from the digestive system are added. Also, salts attach themselves to cholesterol molecules in the bile to keep them from crystallising. If there is too much cholesterol or bilirubin in the bile, or if the gallbladder does not empty properly the systems can fail. This is how gallstones form when a small piece of calcium gets coated with either cholesterol or bilirubin and the bile crystallises and forms a gallstone. The main purpose of the gallbladder is to store and release bile, or gall. Bile is released into the small intestine in order to help in the digestion of fats by breaking down larger molecules into smaller ones. After the fat is absorbed, the bile is also absorbed and transported back to the liver for reuse.

=== Pancreas ===
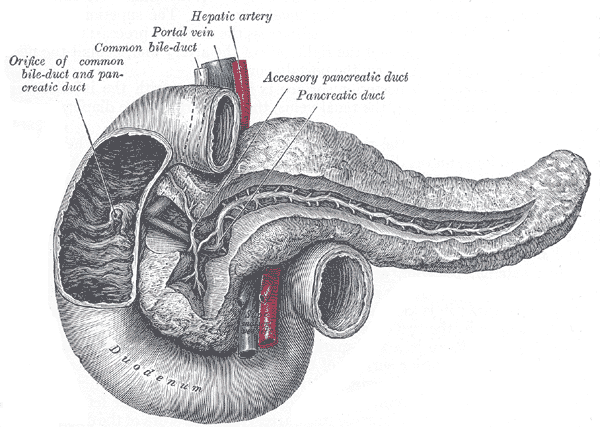
Pancreas, duodenum and bile duct

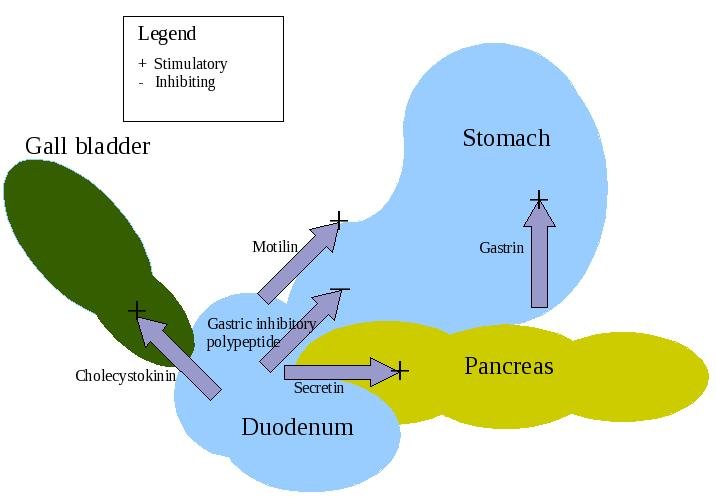
Action of digestive hormones

The pancreas is a major organ functioning as an accessory digestive gland in the digestive system. It is both an endocrine gland and an exocrine gland. The endocrine part secretes insulin when the blood sugar becomes high; insulin moves glucose from the blood into the muscles and other tissues for use as energy. The endocrine part releases glucagon when the blood sugar is low; glucagon allows stored sugar to be broken down into glucose by the liver in order to re-balance the sugar levels. The pancreas produces and releases important digestive enzymes in the pancreatic juice that it delivers to the duodenum. The pancreas lies below and at the back of the stomach. It connects to the duodenum via the pancreatic duct which it joins near to the bile duct's connection where both the bile and pancreatic juice can act on the chyme that is released from the stomach into the duodenum. Aqueous pancreatic secretions from pancreatic duct cells contain bicarbonate ions which are alkaline and help with the bile to neutralise the acidic chyme that is churned out by the stomach.

The pancreas is also the main source of enzymes for the digestion of fats and proteins. Some of these are released in response to the production of cholecystokinin in the duodenum. (The enzymes that digest polysaccharides, by contrast, are primarily produced by the walls of the intestines.) The cells are filled with secretory granules containing the precursor digestive enzymes. The major proteases, the pancreatic enzymes which work on proteins, are trypsinogen and chymotrypsinogen. Elastase is also produced. Smaller amounts of lipase and amylase are secreted. The pancreas also secretes phospholipase A2, lysophospholipase, and cholesterol esterase. The precursor zymogens, are inactive variants of the enzymes; which avoids the onset of pancreatitis caused by autodegradation. Once released in the intestine, the enzyme enteropeptidase present in the intestinal mucosa activates trypsinogen by cleaving it to form trypsin; further cleavage results in chymotripsin.

=== Lower gastrointestinal tract ===
The lower gastrointestinal tract (GI), includes the small intestine and all of the large intestine. The intestine is also called the bowel or the gut. The lower GI tract starts at the pyloric sphincter of the stomach and finishes at the anus. The small intestine is subdivided into the duodenum, the jejunum and the ileum. The cecum marks the division between the small and large intestine. The large intestine includes the rectum and anal canal.

==== Small intestine ====
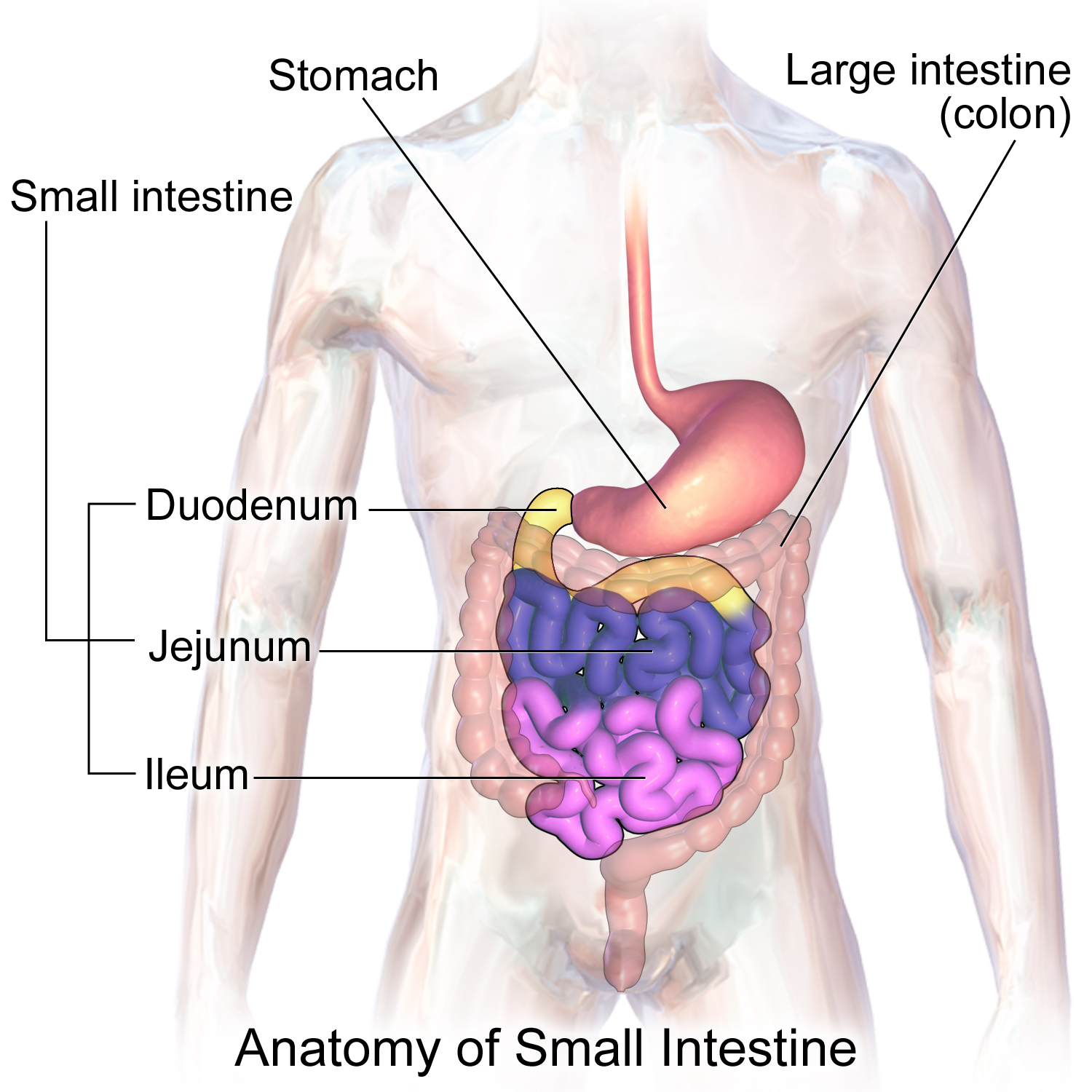
Illustration of small intestine

The small intestine starts at the pyloric sphincter, and finishes at the ileocecal valve. Partially digested food starts to arrive in the small intestine as semi-liquid chyme, one hour after it is eaten. The stomach is half empty after an average of 1.2 hours. After four or five hours the stomach has emptied.

In the small intestine, the pH becomes crucial; it needs to be finely balanced in order to activate digestive enzymes. The chyme is very acidic, with a low pH, having been released from the stomach and needs to be made much more alkaline. This is achieved in the duodenum by the addition of bile from the gall bladder combined with the bicarbonate secretions from the pancreatic duct and also from secretions of bicarbonate-rich mucus from duodenal glands known as Brunner's glands. The chyme arrives in the intestines having been released from the stomach through the opening of the pyloric sphincter. The resulting alkaline fluid mix neutralises the gastric acid which would damage the lining of the intestine. The mucus component lubricates the walls of the intestine.

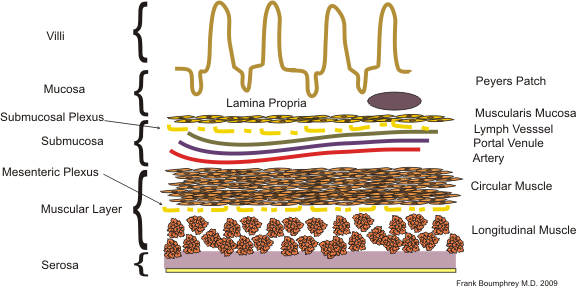
Layers of the small intestine

When the digested food particles are reduced enough in size and composition, they can be absorbed by the intestinal wall and carried to the bloodstream. The first receptacle for this chyme is the duodenal bulb. From here it passes into the first of the three sections of the small intestine, the duodenum (the next section is the jejunum and the third is the ileum). The duodenum is the first and shortest section of the small intestine. It is a hollow, jointed C-shaped tube connecting the stomach to the jejunum. It starts at the duodenal bulb and ends at the suspensory muscle of duodenum. The attachment of the suspensory muscle to the diaphragm is thought to help the passage of food by making a wider angle at its attachment.

Most food digestion takes place in the small intestine. Segmentation contractions act to mix and move the chyme more slowly in the small intestine allowing more time for absorption (and these continue in the large intestine). In the duodenum, pancreatic lipase is secreted together with a co-enzyme, colipase to further digest the fat content of the chyme. From this breakdown, smaller particles of emulsified fats called chylomicrons are produced. There are also digestive cells called enterocytes lining the intestines (the majority being in the small intestine). They are unusual cells in that they have villi on their surface which in turn have innumerable microvilli on their surface. All these villi make for a greater surface area, not only for the absorption of chyme but also for its further digestion by large numbers of digestive enzymes present on the microvilli.

The chylomicrons are small enough to pass through the enterocyte villi and into their lymph capillaries called lacteals. A milky fluid called chyle, consisting mainly of the emulsified fats of the chylomicrons, results from the absorbed mix with the lymph in the lacteals. Chyle is then transported through the lymphatic system to the rest of the body.

The suspensory muscle marks the end of the duodenum and the division between the upper gastrointestinal tract and the lower GI tract. The digestive tract continues as the jejunum which continues as the ileum. The jejunum, the midsection of the small intestine contains circular folds, flaps of doubled mucosal membrane which partially encircle and sometimes completely encircle the lumen of the intestine. These folds together with villi serve to increase the surface area of the jejunum enabling an increased absorption of digested sugars, amino acids and fatty acids into the bloodstream. The circular folds also slow the passage of food giving more time for nutrients to be absorbed.

The last part of the small intestine is the ileum. This also contains villi and vitamin B12; bile acids and any residue nutrients are absorbed here. When the chyme is exhausted of its nutrients the remaining waste material changes into the semi-solids called feces, which pass to the large intestine, where bacteria in the gut flora further break down residual proteins and starches.

Transit time through the small intestine is an average of 4 hours. Half of the food residues of a meal have emptied from the small intestine by an average of 5.4 hours after ingestion. Emptying of the small intestine is complete after an average of 8.6 hours.

==== Cecum ====
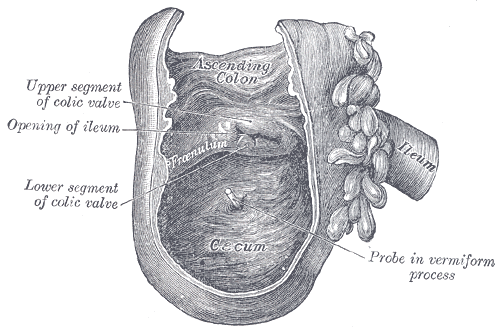
Cecum and beginning of ascending colon

The cecum is a pouch marking the division between the small intestine and the large intestine. It lies below the ileocecal valve in the lower right quadrant of the abdomen. The cecum receives chyme from the last part of the small intestine, the ileum, and connects to the ascending colon of the large intestine. At this junction there is a sphincter or valve, the ileocecal valve which slows the passage of chyme from the ileum, allowing further digestion. It is also the site of the appendix attachment.

==== Large intestine ====
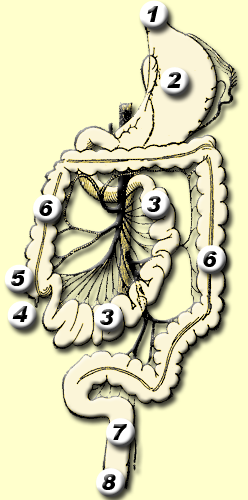
Lower GI tract - 3) Small intestine; 5) Cecum; 6) Large intestine

In the large intestine the passage of the digesting food in the colon is a lot slower, taking from 30 to 40 hours until it is removed by defecation. The colon mainly serves as a site for the fermentation of digestible matter by the gut flora. The time taken varies considerably between individuals. The remaining semi-solid waste is termed feces and is removed by the coordinated contractions of the intestinal walls, termed peristalsis, which propels the excreta forward to reach the rectum and exit through the anus via defecation. The wall has an outer layer of longitudinal muscles, the taeniae coli, and an inner layer of circular muscles. The circular muscle keeps the material moving forward and also prevents any back flow of waste. Also of help in the action of peristalsis is the basal electrical rhythm that determines the frequency of contractions. The taeniae coli can be seen and are responsible for the bulges (haustra) present in the colon. Most parts of the GI tract are covered with serous membranes and have a mesentery. Other more muscular parts are lined with adventitia.

== Blood supply ==
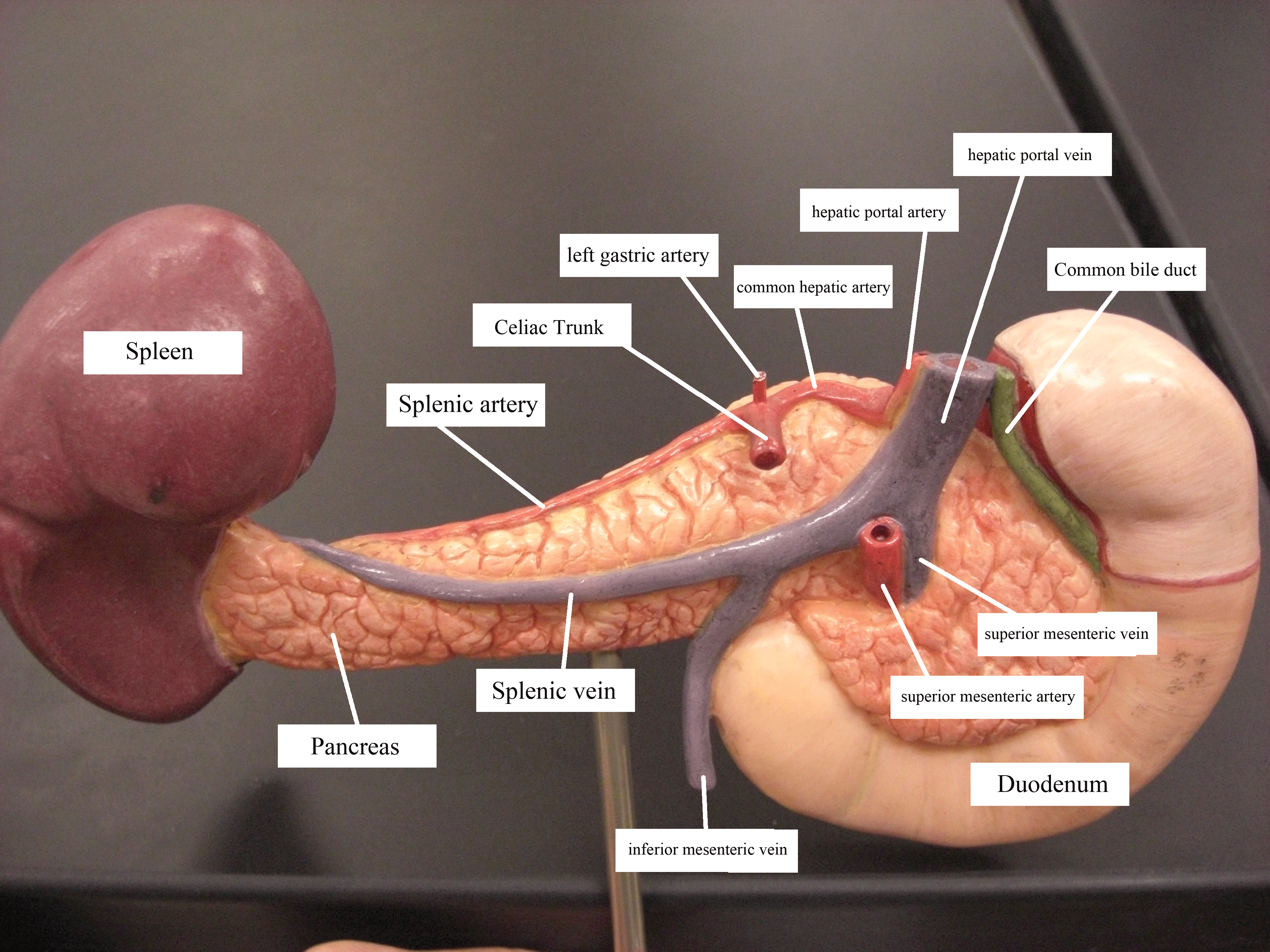
Arteries and veins around the pancreas and spleen

The digestive system is supplied by the celiac artery. The celiac artery is the first major branch from the abdominal aorta, and is the only major artery that nourishes the digestive organs.

There are three main divisions – the left gastric artery, the common hepatic artery and the splenic artery.

The celiac artery supplies the liver, stomach, spleen and the upper 1/3 of the duodenum (to the sphincter of Oddi) and the pancreas with oxygenated blood. Most of the blood is returned to the liver via the portal venous system for further processing and detoxification before returning to the systemic circulation via the hepatic veins.

The next branch from the abdominal aorta is the superior mesenteric artery, which supplies the regions of the digestive tract derived from the midgut, which includes the distal 2/3 of the duodenum, jejunum, ileum, cecum, appendix, ascending colon, and the proximal 2/3 of the transverse colon.

The final branch which is important for the digestive system is the inferior mesenteric artery, which supplies the regions of the digestive tract derived from the hindgut, which includes the distal 1/3 of the transverse colon, descending colon, sigmoid colon, rectum, and the anus above the pectinate line.

Blood flow to the digestive tract reaches its maximum 20–40 minutes after a meal and lasts for 1.5–2 hours.

== Nerve supply ==
The enteric nervous system consists of some one hundred million neurons that are embedded in the peritoneum, the lining of the gastrointestinal tract extending from the esophagus to the anus. These neurons are collected into two plexuses – the myenteric (or Auerbach's) plexus that lies between the longitudinal and the smooth muscle layers, and the submucosal (or Meissner's) plexus that lies between the circular smooth muscle layer and the mucosa.

Parasympathetic innervation to the ascending colon is supplied by the vagus nerve. Sympathetic innervation is supplied by the splanchnic nerves that join the celiac ganglia. Most of the digestive tract is innervated by the two large celiac ganglia, with the upper part of each ganglion joined by the greater splanchnic nerve and the lower parts joined by the lesser splanchnic nerve. It is from these ganglia that many of the gastric plexuses arise.

== Development ==
Early in embryonic development, the embryo has three germ layers and abuts a yolk sac. During the second week of development, the embryo grows and begins to surround and envelop portions of this sac. The enveloped portions form the basis for the adult gastrointestinal tract. Sections of this foregut begin to differentiate into the organs of the gastrointestinal tract, such as the esophagus, stomach, and intestines.

During the fourth week of development, the stomach rotates. The stomach, originally lying in the midline of the embryo, rotates so that its body is on the left. This rotation also affects the part of the gastrointestinal tube immediately below the stomach, which will go on to become the duodenum. By the end of the fourth week, the developing duodenum begins to spout a small outpouching on its right side, the hepatic diverticulum, which will go on to become the biliary tree. Just below this is a second outpouching, known as the cystic diverticulum, that will eventually develop into the gallbladder.

== Clinical significance ==
Each part of the digestive system is subject to a wide range of disorders many of which can be congenital. Mouth diseases can also be caused by pathogenic bacteria, viruses, fungi and as a side effect of some medications. Mouth diseases include tongue diseases and salivary gland diseases. A common gum disease in the mouth is gingivitis which is caused by bacteria in plaque. The most common viral infection of the mouth is gingivostomatitis caused by herpes simplex. A common fungal infection is candidiasis commonly known as thrush which affects the mucous membranes of the mouth.

There are a number of esophageal diseases such as the development of Schatzki rings that can restrict the passageway, causing difficulties in swallowing. They can also completely block the esophagus.

Stomach diseases are often chronic conditions and include gastroparesis, gastritis, and peptic ulcers.

A number of problems including malnutrition and anemia can arise from malabsorption, the abnormal absorption of nutrients in the GI tract. Malabsorption can have many causes ranging from infection, to enzyme deficiencies such as exocrine pancreatic insufficiency. It can also arise as a result of other gastrointestinal diseases such as coeliac disease. Coeliac disease is an autoimmune disorder of the small intestine. This can cause vitamin deficiencies due to the improper absorption of nutrients in the small intestine. The small intestine can also be obstructed by a volvulus, a loop of intestine that becomes twisted enclosing its attached mesentery. This can cause mesenteric ischemia if severe enough.

A common disorder of the bowel is diverticulitis. Diverticula are small pouches that can form inside the bowel wall, which can become inflamed to give diverticulitis. This disease can have complications if an inflamed diverticulum bursts and infection sets in. Any infection can spread further to the lining of the abdomen (peritoneum) and cause potentially fatal peritonitis.

Crohn's disease is a common chronic inflammatory bowel disease (IBD), which can affect any part of the GI tract, but it mostly starts in the terminal ileum.

Ulcerative colitis, an ulcerative form of colitis, is the other major inflammatory bowel disease which is restricted to the colon and rectum. Both of these IBDs can give an increased risk of the development of colorectal cancer. Ulcerative colitis is the most common of the IBDs

Irritable bowel syndrome (IBS) is the most common of the functional gastrointestinal disorders. These are idiopathic disorders that the Rome process has helped to define.

Giardiasis is a disease of the small intestine caused by a protist parasite Giardia lamblia. This does not spread but remains confined to the lumen of the small intestine. It can often be asymptomatic, but as often can be indicated by a variety of symptoms. Giardiasis is the most common pathogenic parasitic infection in humans.

There are diagnostic tools mostly involving the ingestion of barium sulphate to investigate disorders of the GI tract. These are known as upper gastrointestinal series that enable imaging of the pharynx, larynx, oesophagus, stomach and small intestine and lower gastrointestinal series for imaging of the colon.

=== Cancer ===
The estimated new cases of digestive system cancer in the Unitied States in 2023 was 348,840 and the estimated number of deaths from digestive system cancers was 172,010. The major specific causes of digestive system cancer related death in 2023 were cancers of the colon and rectum (52,550), pancreas (50,550), liver and intrahepatic bile duct (29,380), esophagus (16,120) and stomach (11,130). Bile acids, when present in specific regions of the digestive system at abnormally high levels, have been implicated as important carcinogens.

=== In pregnancy ===
Gestation can predispose for certain digestive disorders. Gestational diabetes can develop in the mother as a result of pregnancy and while this often presents with few symptoms it can lead to pre-eclampsia.

== History ==
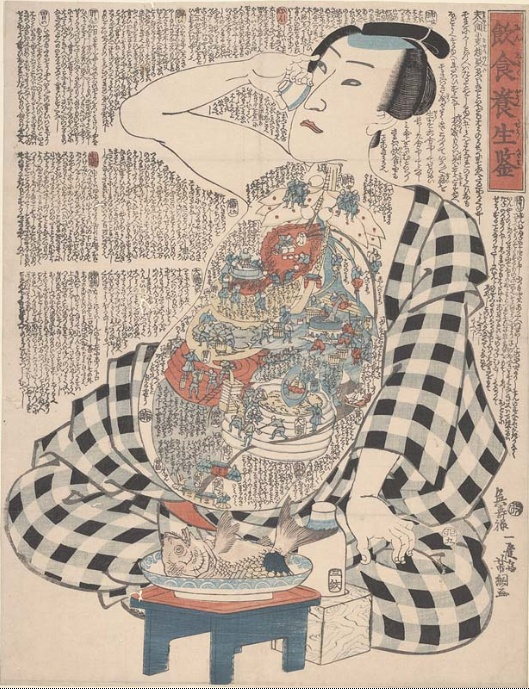
Dietary life rules, Japan, Edo period. Illustrating the ill effects of drinking alcohol on the digestive system.

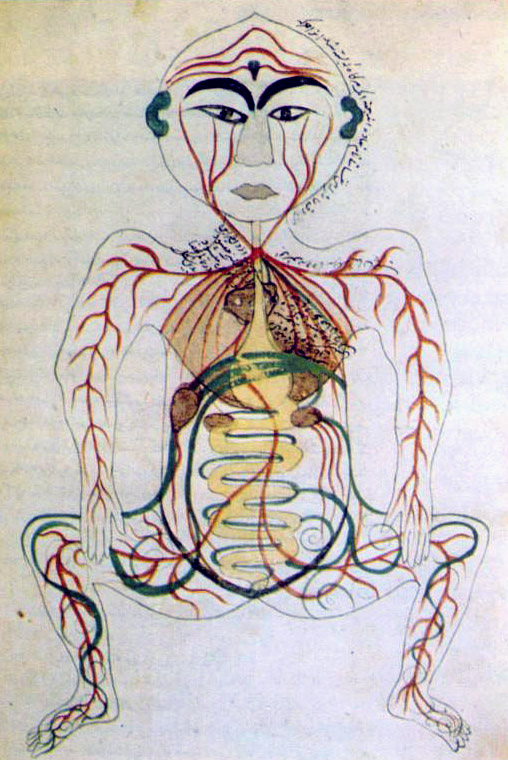
Historical depiction of the digestive system, 17th century Persia

In the early 11th century, the Islamic medical philosopher Avicenna wrote extensively on many subjects including medicine. Forty of these treatises on medicine survive, and in the most famous one titled the Canon of Medicine he discusses "rising gas". Avicenna believed that digestive system dysfunction was responsible for the overproduction of gas in the gastrointestinal tract. He suggested lifestyle changes and a compound of herbal drugs for its treatment.

In 1497, Alessandro Benedetti viewed the stomach as an unclean organ separated off by the diaphragm. This view of the stomach and intestines as being base organs was generally held until the mid-17th century.

In the Renaissance of the 16th century, Leonardo da Vinci produced some early drawings of the stomach and intestines. He thought that the digestive system aided the respiratory system. Andreas Vesalius provided some early anatomical drawings of the abdominal organs in the 16th century.

In the middle of the 17th century, a Flemish physician Jan Baptist van Helmont offered the first chemical account of digestion which was later described as being very close to the later conceptualised enzyme.

In 1653, William Harvey described the intestines in terms of their length, their blood supply, the mesenteries, and fat (adenylyl cyclase).

In 1823, William Prout discovered hydrochloric acid in the gastric juice. In 1895, Ivan Pavlov described its secretion as being stimulated by a neurologic reflex with the vagus nerve having a crucial role. Black in the 19th century suggested an association of histamine with this secretion. In 1916, Popielski described histamine as a gastric secretagogue of hydrochloric acid.

William Beaumont was an army surgeon who in 1825, was able to observe digestion as it took place in the stomach. This was made possible by experiments on a man with a stomach wound that did not fully heal leaving an opening into the stomach. The churning motion of the stomach was described among other findings.

In the 19th century, it was accepted that chemical processes were involved in the process of digestion. Physiological research into secretion and the gastrointestinal tract was pursued with experiments undertaken by Claude Bernard, Rudolph Heidenhain and Ivan Pavlov.

The rest of the 20th century was dominated by research into enzymes. The first to be discovered was secretin by Ernest Starling in 1902, with ensuing results from John Edkins in 1905 who first suggested gastrin with its structure being determined in 1964. Andre Latarjet and Lester Dragstedt found a role for acetylcholine in the digestive system. In 1972, H2 receptor agonists were described by J. Black, that block the action of histamine and decrease the production of hydrochloric acid. In 1980, proton pump inhibitors were described by Sachs. In 1983, the role of Helicobacter pylori in the formation of ulcers was described by Barry Marshall, and Robin Warren.

Art historians have often noted that banqueters on iconographic records of ancient Mediterranean societies almost always appear to be lying down on their left sides. One possible explanation could lie in the anatomy of the stomach and in the digestive mechanism. When lying on the left, the food has room to expand because the curvature of the stomach is enhanced in that position.

== See also ==
- Abdominal internal oblique muscle
- Ulcerative colitis
