= Phases of digestion =

The nervous system and endocrine system collaborate in the digestive system to control gastric secretions, and motility associated with the movement of food throughout the gastrointestinal tract, including peristalsis, and segmentation contractions.

Gastric activity involved in digestion is divided into three phases of digestion known as the cephalic phase, the gastric phase, and the intestinal phase. These phases overlap and all three can occur simultaneously.

A fourth phase of acid secretion is known as the basal state which occurs in the times between meals (interdigestive phase). The level of acid secretion during these times is regulated by body weight, individual, number of parietal cells, and time of day. Acid secretion is lowest in the morning before awakening and highest at night.

== Phases ==
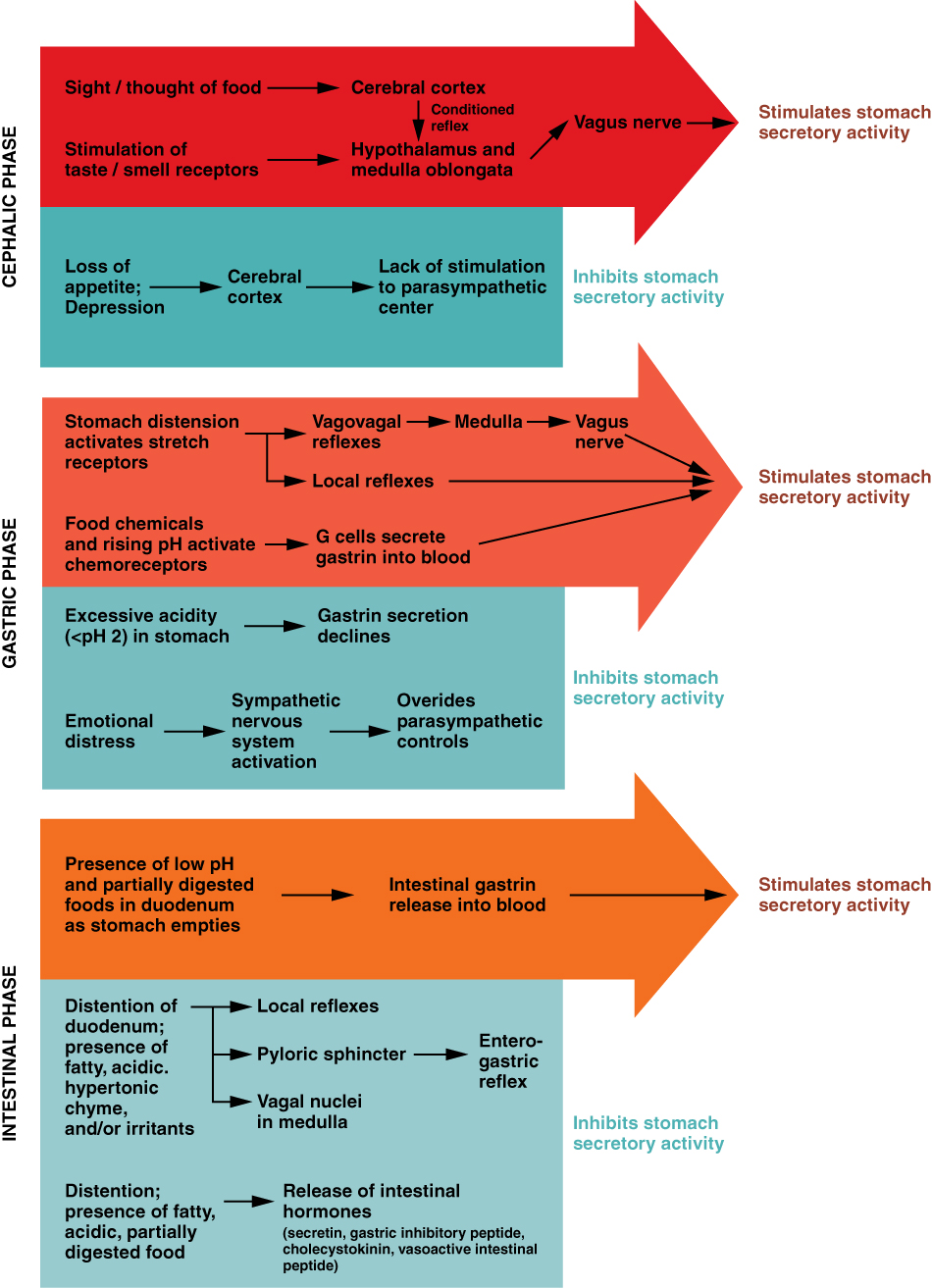
The three phases of gastric secretion

=== Cephalic phase ===
The cephalic phase of digestion is the stage in which the stomach responds to the mere sight, smell, taste, or thought of desired food. About 20% of total acid secretion occurs before food enters the stomach. These sensory and mental inputs converge on the hypothalamus to induce the responses needed for preparing the gastrointestinal tract for food processing, which relays signals to the medulla oblongata. Vagus nerve fibers from the medulla stimulate the parasympathetic nervous system of the stomach which, in turn, stimulates gastric secretion (via parietal and G cells). This enhanced secretory activity brought on by the thought or sight of food is a conditioned reflex. It only occurs when food is desired. When appetite is depressed this part of the cephalic reflex is inhibited.

==== Chain of events ====
Sensory stimuli from food activate dorsal motor nucleus of vagus nerve in the medulla (activating the parasympathetic nervous system). Insulin induced hypoglycemia also stimulates the vagus nerve. This results in four distinct physiological events.

1) In the body of the stomach, the vagal postganglionic muscarinic nerves release acetylcholine (ACh) which stimulates parietal cell H+ secretion.

2) In the lamina propria of the body of the stomach the ACh released from the vagal endings triggers histamine secretion from ECL cells. Histamine also stimulates H+ secretion from parietal cells.

3) In the antrum, peptidergic postganglionic parasympathetic vagal neurons and other enteric nervous system neurons release GRP which stimulates antral G cells to produce and release gastrin. Gastrin stimulates gastric acid secretion by directly stimulating parietal cells as well as by promoting histamine secretion by ECL cells.

4) In both the antrum and corpus, the vagus nerve inhibits delta cells (D cells), thus reducing their release of somatostatin and reducing background inhibition of gastrin release.

=== Activation of gastric chief cells ===
Gastric chief cells are primarily activated by ACh. However the decrease in pH caused by activation of parietal cells further activates gastric chief cells. Alternatively, acid in the duodenum can stimulate S cells to secrete secretin which acts on an endocrine path to deactivate gastric chief cells.

=== Gastric phase ===
50-60% of total gastric acid secretion occurs during this phase. The gastric phase is a period in which swallowed food and semidigested protein (peptides and amino acids) activate gastric activity. Ingested food stimulates gastric activity in two ways: by stretching the stomach and by gastric contents stimulating receptors in the stomach. Stretch activates two reflexes: a short reflex mediated through the myenteric plexus, and a long reflex mediated through the vagus nerves and brainstem.

==== Distention path ====
1.) Vagovagal reflex: Distention, or stretching, activates an afferent pathway which in turn stimulates efferent response from the dorsal nucleus of vagus nerve. Stimulation of acid secretion occurs as it does in the cephalic phase.

2.) Local ENS Pathway: Activated ENS releases ACh-stimulating parietal cells to secrete acid.

==== Chemical activation ====
As dietary protein is digested, it breaks down into smaller peptides and amino acids, which directly stimulate the G cells to secrete even more gastrin – a positive feedback loop that accelerates protein digestion. As discussed earlier, gastrin stimulates by activating parietal cells and stimulating ECL to produce histamine (histamine stimulates parietal cells to produce acid). Small peptides also buffer stomach acid so the pH does not fall excessively low.

Gastric secretion is stimulated chiefly by three chemicals: acetylcholine (ACh), histamine, and gastrin. ACh is secreted by parasympathetic nerve fibers of both the short and long reflex pathways. Histamine is a paracrine secretion from the enteroendocrine cells in the gastric glands. Gastrin is a hormone produced by enteroendocrine G cells in the pyloric glands.

All three of these stimulate parietal cells to secrete hydrochloric acid and intrinsic factor. The chief cells secrete pepsinogen in response to gastrin and especially Ach, and ACh also stimulates mucus secretion.

==== Inhibitory pathway ====
Low intragastric pH stimulates antral D cells to release somatostatin. Somatostatin inhibits gastrin release from G cells. Reduced gastrin secretion reduces acid secretion.

=== Intestinal phase ===
5-10% of gastric secretion occurs during this phase.

The intestinal phase is a stage in which the duodenum responds to arriving chyme and moderates gastric activity through hormones and nervous reflexes. The duodenum initially enhances gastric secretion, but soon inhibits it.

==== Duodenal stimulation ====
The presence of partially digested proteins and amino acids in the duodenum stimulates acid secretion in the stomach by four methods:

1.) Peptones stimulate duodenal G cells to secrete gastrin.

2.) Peptones stimulate an unknown endocrine cell to release an additional humoral signal, "enterooxytonin".

3.) Amino acids absorbed by the duodenum stimulate acid secretion by unknown mechanisms.

4.) Osmolarity due to products of digestion stimulate acid secretion

==== Duodenal inhibition ====
The acid and semi-digested fats in the duodenum trigger the enterogastric reflex – the duodenum sends inhibitory signals to the stomach by way of the enteric nervous system, and sends signals to the medulla that (1) inhibit the vagal nuclei, thus reducing vagal stimulation of the stomach, and (2) stimulate sympathetic neurons, which send inhibitory signals to the stomach. Chyme also stimulates duodenal enteroendocrine cells to release secretin and cholecystokinin. They primarily stimulate the pancreas and gall bladder, but also suppress gastric secretion and motility. The effect of this is that gastrin secretion declines and the pyloric sphincter contracts tightly to limit the admission of more chyme into the duodenum. This gives the duodenum time to work on the chyme it has already received before being loaded with more. The enteroendocrine cells also secrete glucose dependent insulinotropic peptide. Originally called gastric-inhibitory peptide, it is no longer thought to have a significant effect on the stomach, but to be more concerned with stimulating insulin secretion in preparation for processing the nutrients about to be absorbed by the small intestine.

=== Basal state ===
There is small continuous basal secretion of gastric acid between meals of usually less than 10 mEq/hour.

== Basal electrical rhythm ==
The basal electrical rhythm acts as the pacemaker of the stomach, controlling the smooth muscle of the stomach and intestines, and the actions of peristalsis, and segmentation contractions. The basal electrical rhythm is a 0.5 Hz, very low frequency slow wave. It is constantly generated by special interstitial cells of Cajal in the corpus of the stomach. The slow wave is sent to the brain mainly via vagal afferents.
