= Enterogastrone =

Human hornone

An enterogastrone is any hormone secreted by the mucosa of the duodenum in the lower gastrointestinal tract in response to dietary lipids that inhibits the caudal (or "forward, analward") motion of the contents of chyme. The function of enterogastrones is almost the same as gastric inhibitory polypeptide — i.e., to inhibit gastric secretion and stomach motility.

== Examples ==
Examples include:

- Secretin
- Cholecystokinin
