= Digestion =

Biological process of breaking down food

Digestive system

Details

Identifiers
- Latin: systema digestorium
- MeSH: D004063

Digestion is the breakdown of large insoluble food compounds into small water-soluble components so that they can be absorbed into the blood plasma. In certain organisms, these smaller substances are absorbed through the small intestine into the blood stream. Digestion is a form of catabolism that is often divided into two processes based on how food is broken down: mechanical and chemical digestion. The term mechanical digestion refers to the physical breakdown of large pieces of food into smaller pieces which can subsequently be accessed by digestive enzymes. Mechanical digestion takes place in the mouth through mastication and in the small intestine through segmentation contractions. In chemical digestion, enzymes break down food into the small compounds that the body can use.

In the human digestive system, food enters the mouth and mechanical digestion of the food starts by the action of mastication (chewing), a form of mechanical digestion, and the wetting contact of saliva. Saliva, a liquid secreted by the salivary glands, contains salivary amylase, an enzyme which starts the digestion of starch in the food. The saliva also contains mucus, which lubricates the food; the electrolyte hydrogencarbonate (HCO^{−}_{3}), which provides the ideal conditions of pH for amylase to work; and other electrolytes (Na^{+}, K^{+}, Cl^{−}). About 30% of starch is hydrolyzed into disaccharide in the oral cavity (mouth). After undergoing mastication and starch digestion, the food will be in the form of a small, round slurry mass called a bolus. It will then travel down the esophagus and into the stomach by the action of peristalsis. Gastric juice in the stomach starts protein digestion. Gastric juice mainly contains hydrochloric acid and pepsin. In infants and toddlers, gastric juice also contains rennin to digest milk proteins. As the first two chemicals may damage the stomach wall, mucus and bicarbonates are secreted by the stomach. They provide a slimy layer that acts as a shield against the damaging effects of chemicals like concentrated hydrochloric acid while also aiding lubrication. Hydrochloric acid provides acidic pH for pepsin. At the same time protein digestion is occurring, mechanical mixing occurs by peristalsis, which is waves of muscular contractions that move along the stomach wall. This allows the mass of food to further mix with the digestive enzymes. Pepsin breaks down proteins into peptides or proteoses, which are further broken down into dipeptides and amino acids by enzymes in the small intestine. Studies suggest that increasing the number of chews per bite increases relevant gut hormones and may decrease self-reported hunger and food intake.

When the pyloric sphincter valve opens, partially digested food (chyme) enters the duodenum where it mixes with digestive enzymes from the pancreas and bile juice from the liver and then passes through the small intestine, in which digestion continues. When the chyme is fully digested, it is passed through the liver before being absorbed into the blood. 95% of nutrient absorption occurs in the small intestine. Water and minerals are reabsorbed back into the blood in the colon (large intestine) where the pH is slightly acidic (about 5.6 ~ 6.9). Some vitamins, such as biotin and vitamin K (K_{2}MK7) produced by bacteria in the colon are also absorbed into the blood in the colon. Absorption of water, simple sugar and alcohol also takes place in stomach. Waste material (feces) is eliminated from the rectum during defecation.

== Digestive system ==
Digestive systems take many forms. There is a fundamental distinction between internal and external digestion. External digestion developed earlier in evolutionary history, and most fungi still rely on it. In this process, enzymes are secreted into the environment surrounding the organism, where they break down an organic material, and some of the products diffuse back to the organism. Animals have a tube (gastrointestinal tract) in which internal digestion occurs, which is more efficient because more of the broken down products can be captured, and the internal chemical environment can be more efficiently controlled.

Some organisms, including nearly all spiders, secrete biotoxins and digestive chemicals (e.g., enzymes) into the extracellular environment prior to ingestion of the consequent "soup". In others, once potential nutrients or food is inside the organism, digestion can be conducted to a vesicle or a sac-like structure, through a tube, or through several specialized organs aimed at making the absorption of nutrients more efficient.

Schematic drawing of bacterial conjugation. 1- Donor cell produces pilus. 2- Pilus attaches to recipient cell, bringing the two cells together. 3- The mobile plasmid is nicked and a single strand of DNA is transferred to the recipient cell. 4- Both cells recircularize their plasmids, synthesize second strands, and reproduce pili; both cells are now viable donors.

=== Secretion systems ===
Bacteria use several systems to obtain nutrients from other organisms in the environments.

==== Channel transport system ====
In a channel transport system, several proteins form a contiguous channel traversing the inner and outer membranes of the bacteria. It is a simple system, which consists of only three protein subunits: the ABC protein, membrane fusion protein (MFP), and outer membrane protein. This secretion system transports various chemical species, from ions, drugs, to proteins of various sizes (20–900 kDa). The chemical species secreted vary in size from the small Escherichia coli peptide colicin V, (10 kDa) to the Pseudomonas fluorescens cell adhesion protein LapA of 900 kDa.

==== Molecular syringe ====
A type III secretion system means that a molecular syringe is used through which a bacterium (e.g. certain types of Salmonella, Shigella, Yersinia) can inject nutrients into protist cells. One such mechanism was first discovered in Y. pestis and showed that toxins could be injected directly from the bacterial cytoplasm into the cytoplasm of its host's cells rather than be secreted into the extracellular medium.

==== Conjugation machinery ====
The conjugation machinery of some bacteria (and archaeal flagella) is capable of transporting both DNA and proteins. It was discovered in Agrobacterium tumefaciens, which uses this system to introduce the Ti plasmid and proteins into the host, which develops the crown gall (tumor). The VirB complex of Agrobacterium tumefaciens is the prototypic system.

In the nitrogen-fixing Rhizobia, conjugative elements naturally engage in inter-kingdom conjugation. Such elements as the Agrobacterium Ti or Ri plasmids contain elements that can transfer to plant cells. Transferred genes enter the plant cell nucleus and effectively transform the plant cells into factories for the production of opines, which the bacteria use as carbon and energy sources. Infected plant cells form crown gall or root tumors. The Ti and Ri plasmids are thus endosymbionts of the bacteria, which are in turn endosymbionts (or parasites) of the infected plant.

The Ti and Ri plasmids are themselves conjugative. Ti and Ri transfer between bacteria uses an independent system (the tra, or transfer, operon) from that for inter-kingdom transfer (the vir, or virulence, operon). Such transfer creates virulent strains from previously avirulent Agrobacteria.

==== Release of outer membrane vesicles ====
In addition to the use of the multiprotein complexes listed above, gram-negative bacteria possess another method for release of material: the formation of outer membrane vesicles. Portions of the outer membrane pinch off, forming spherical structures made of a lipid bilayer enclosing periplasmic materials. Vesicles from a number of bacterial species have been found to contain virulence factors, some have immunomodulatory effects, and some can directly adhere to and intoxicate host cells. While release of vesicles has been demonstrated as a general response to stress conditions, the process of loading cargo proteins seems to be selective.

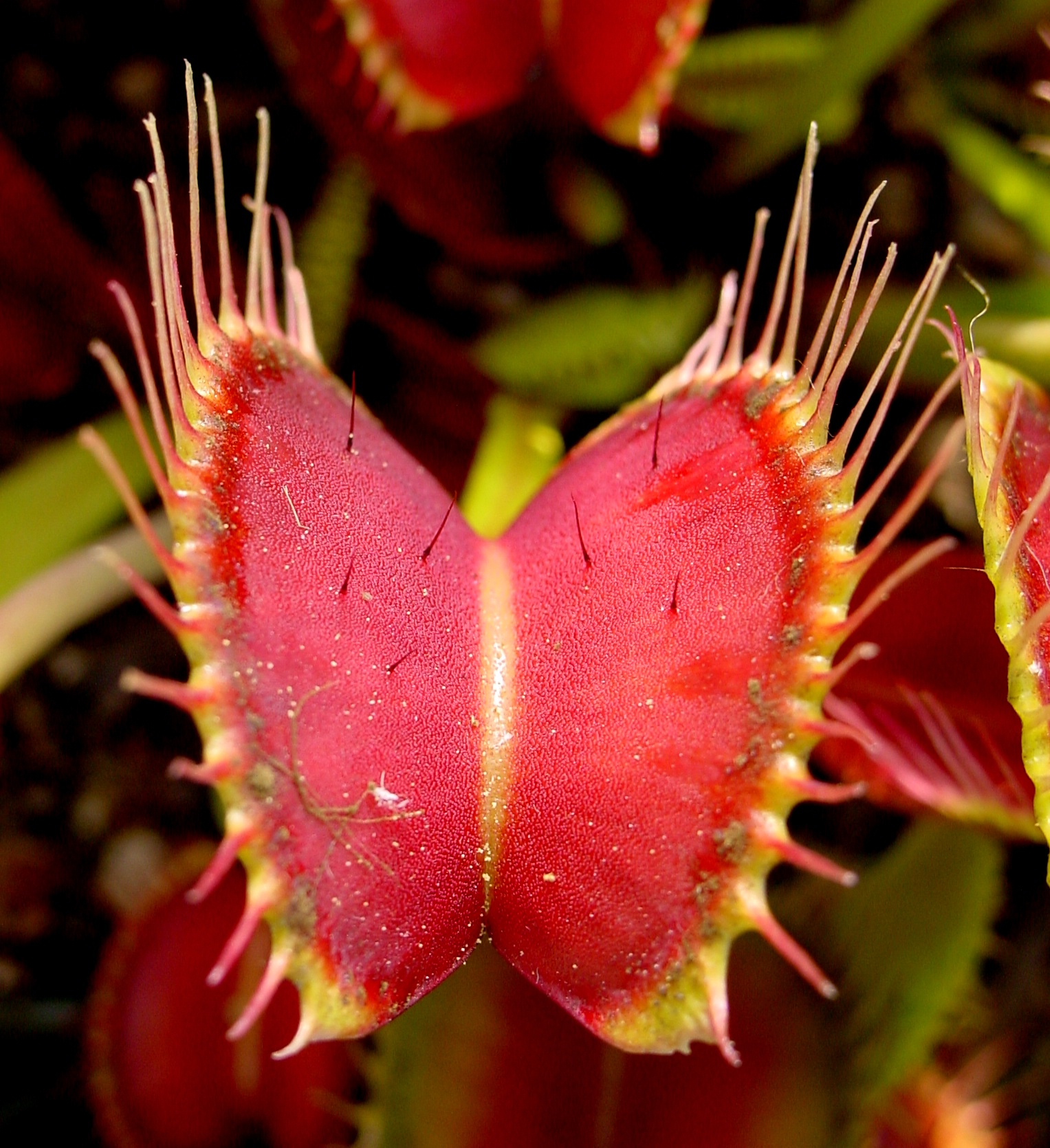
Venus Flytrap (Dionaea muscipula) leaf

=== Gastrovascular cavity ===
The gastrovascular cavity functions as a stomach in both digestion and the distribution of nutrients to all parts of the body. Extracellular digestion takes place within this central cavity, which is lined with the gastrodermis, the internal layer of epithelium. This cavity has only one opening to the outside that functions as both a mouth and an anus: waste and undigested matter is excreted through the mouth/anus, which can be described as an incomplete gut.

In a plant such as the Venus flytrap that can make its own food through photosynthesis, it does not eat and digest its prey for the traditional objectives of harvesting energy and carbon, but mines prey primarily for essential nutrients (nitrogen and phosphorus in particular) that are in short supply in its boggy, acidic habitat.

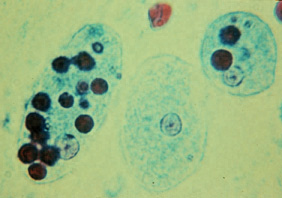
Trophozoites of Entamoeba histolytica with ingested erythrocytes

=== Phagosome ===
A phagosome is a vacuole formed around a particle absorbed by phagocytosis. The vacuole is formed by the fusion of the cell membrane around the particle. A phagosome is a cellular compartment in which pathogenic microorganisms can be killed and digested. Phagosomes fuse with lysosomes in their maturation process, forming phagolysosomes. In humans, Entamoeba histolytica can phagocytose red blood cells.

=== Specialised organs and behaviours ===
To aid in the digestion of their food, animals evolved organs such as beaks, tongues, radulae, teeth, crops, gizzards, and others.

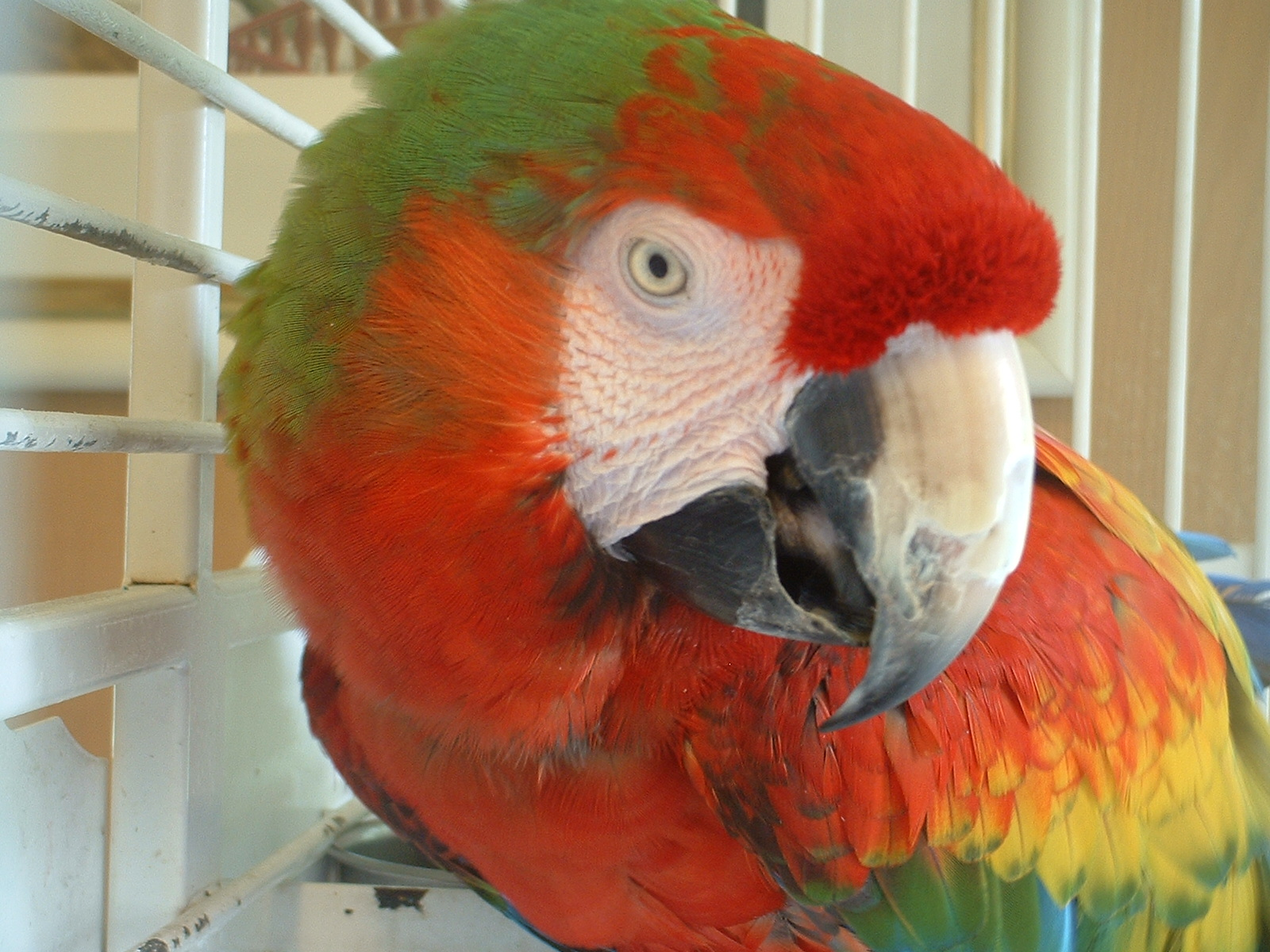
A Catalina Macaw's seed-shearing beak

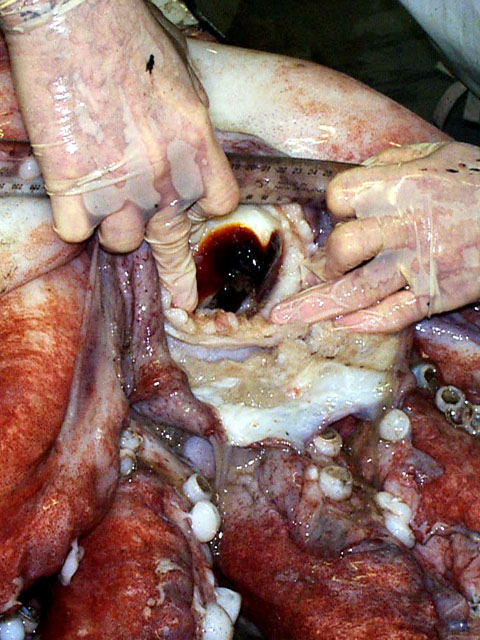
Squid beak with ruler for size comparison

==== Beaks ====
Birds have bony beaks that are specialised according to the bird's ecological niche. For example, macaws primarily eat seeds, nuts, and fruit, using their beaks to open even the toughest seed. First they scratch a thin line with the sharp point of the beak, then they shear the seed open with the sides of the beak.

The mouth of the squid is equipped with a sharp horny beak mainly made of cross-linked proteins. It is used to kill and tear prey into manageable pieces. The beak is very robust, but does not contain any minerals, unlike the teeth and jaws of many other organisms, including marine species. The beak is the only indigestible part of the squid.

==== Tongue ====
The tongue is skeletal muscle on the floor of the mouth of most vertebrates, that manipulates food for chewing (mastication) and swallowing (deglutition). It is sensitive and kept moist by saliva. The underside of the tongue is covered with a smooth mucous membrane. The tongue also has a touch sense for locating and positioning food particles that require further chewing. The tongue is used to roll food particles into a bolus before being transported down the esophagus through peristalsis.

The sublingual region underneath the front of the tongue is a location where the oral mucosa is very thin, and underlain by a plexus of veins. This is an ideal location for introducing certain medications to the body. The sublingual route takes advantage of the highly vascular quality of the oral cavity, and allows for the speedy application of medication into the cardiovascular system, bypassing the gastrointestinal tract.

==== Teeth ====
Teeth (singular tooth) are small whitish structures found in the jaws (or mouths) of many vertebrates that are used to tear, scrape, milk and chew food. Teeth are not made of bone, but rather of tissues of varying density and hardness, such as enamel, dentine and cementum. Human teeth have a blood and nerve supply which enables proprioception. This is the ability of sensation when chewing, for example if we were to bite into something too hard for our teeth, such as a chipped plate mixed in food, our teeth send a message to our brain and we realise that it cannot be chewed, so we stop trying.

The shapes, sizes and numbers of types of animals' teeth are related to their diets. For example, herbivores have a number of molars which are used to grind plant matter, which is difficult to digest. Carnivores have canine teeth which are used to kill and tear meat.

==== Crop ====
A crop, or croup, is a thin-walled expanded portion of the alimentary tract used for the storage of food prior to digestion. In some birds it is an expanded, muscular pouch near the gullet or throat. In adult doves and pigeons, the crop can produce crop milk to feed newly hatched birds.

Certain insects may have a crop or enlarged esophagus.

Rough illustration of a ruminant digestive system

==== Abomasum ====
Herbivores have evolved cecums (or an abomasum in the case of ruminants). Ruminants have a fore-stomach with four chambers. These are the rumen, reticulum, omasum, and abomasum. In the first two chambers, the rumen and the reticulum, the food is mixed with saliva and separates into layers of solid and liquid material. Solids clump together to form the cud (or bolus). The cud is then regurgitated, chewed slowly to completely mix it with saliva and to break down the particle size.

Fibre, especially cellulose and hemi-cellulose, is primarily broken down into the volatile fatty acids, acetic acid, propionic acid and butyric acid in these chambers (the reticulo-rumen) by microbes: (bacteria, protozoa, and fungi). In the omasum, water and many of the inorganic mineral elements are absorbed into the blood stream.

The abomasum is the fourth and final stomach compartment in ruminants. It is a close equivalent of a monogastric stomach (e.g., those in humans or pigs), and digesta is processed here in much the same way. It serves primarily as a site for acid hydrolysis of microbial and dietary protein, preparing these protein sources for further digestion and absorption in the small intestine. Digesta is finally moved into the small intestine, where the digestion and absorption of nutrients occurs. Microbes produced in the reticulo-rumen are also digested in the small intestine.

==== Specialised behaviours ====
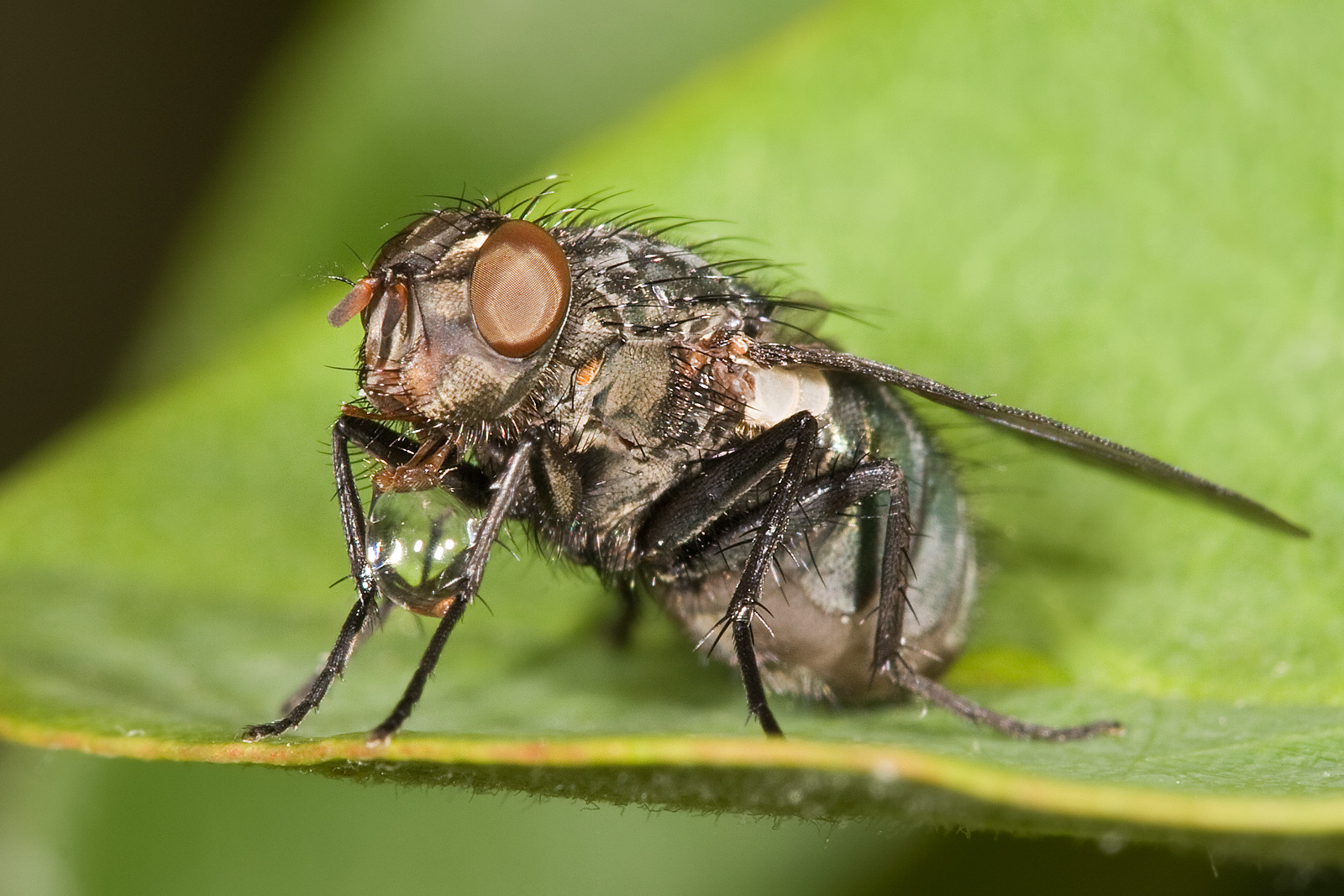
A flesh fly "blowing a bubble", possibly to concentrate its food by evaporating water

Regurgitation has been mentioned above under abomasum and crop, referring to crop milk, a secretion from the lining of the crop of pigeons and doves with which the parents feed their young by regurgitation.

Many sharks have the ability to turn their stomachs inside out and evert it out of their mouths in order to get rid of unwanted contents (perhaps developed as a way to reduce exposure to toxins).

Other animals, such as rabbits and rodents, produce cecotropes to re-digest food, especially in the case of roughage. Capybaras, rabbits, hamsters, and other related species do not have a complex digestive system as ruminants. They instead extract more nutrition by giving their food a second pass through the gut. Soft cecotropes of partially digested food are excreted and generally consumed immediately. They also produce normal droppings, which are not eaten.

Young elephants, pandas, koalas, and hippos eat the faeces of their mother, probably to obtain the bacteria required to properly digest vegetation. When they are born, their intestines do not contain these bacteria (they are completely sterile). Without them, they would be unable to get any nutritional value from many plant components.

=== In earthworms ===
An earthworm's digestive system consists of a mouth, pharynx, esophagus, crop, gizzard, and intestine. The mouth is surrounded by strong lips, which act like a hand to grab pieces of dead grass, leaves, and weeds, with bits of soil to help chew. The lips break the food down into smaller pieces. In the pharynx, the food is lubricated by mucus secretions for easier passage. The esophagus adds calcium carbonate to neutralize the acids formed by food matter decay. Temporary storage occurs in the crop where food and calcium carbonate are mixed. The powerful muscles of the gizzard churn and mix the mass of food and dirt. When the churning is complete, the glands in the walls of the gizzard add enzymes to the thick paste, which helps chemically breakdown the organic matter. By peristalsis, the mixture is sent to the intestine where friendly bacteria continue chemical breakdown. This releases carbohydrates, protein, fat, and various vitamins and minerals for absorption into the body.

== Overview of vertebrate digestion ==
In most vertebrates, digestion is a multistage process in the digestive system, starting from ingestion of raw materials, most often other organisms. Ingestion usually involves some type of mechanical and chemical processing. Digestion is separated into four steps:

1. Ingestion: placing food into the mouth (entry of food in the digestive system),
2. Mechanical and chemical breakdown: mastication and the mixing of the resulting bolus with water, acids, bile and enzymes in the stomach and intestine to break down complex chemical species into simple structures,
3. Absorption: of nutrients from the digestive system to the circulatory and lymphatic capillaries through osmosis, active transport, and diffusion, and
4. Egestion (Excretion): Removal of undigested materials from the digestive tract through defecation.

Underlying the process is muscle movement throughout the system through swallowing and peristalsis. Each step in digestion requires energy, and thus imposes an "overhead charge" on the energy made available from absorbed substances. Differences in that overhead cost are important influences on lifestyle, behavior, and even physical structures. Examples may be seen in humans, who differ considerably from other hominids (lack of hair, smaller jaws and musculature, different dentition, length of intestines, cooking, etc.).

The major part of digestion takes place in the small intestine. The large intestine primarily serves as a site for fermentation of indigestible matter by gut bacteria and for resorption of water from digests before excretion.

In mammals, preparation for digestion begins with the cephalic phase in which saliva is produced in the mouth and digestive enzymes are produced in the stomach. Mechanical and chemical digestion begin in the mouth where food is chewed, and mixed with saliva to begin enzymatic processing of starches. The stomach continues to break food down mechanically and chemically through churning and mixing with both acids and enzymes. Absorption occurs in the stomach and gastrointestinal tract, and the process finishes with defecation.

== Human digestion process ==
Upper and lower human gastrointestinal tract

The human gastrointestinal tract is around 9 metres (30 feet) long. Food digestion physiology varies between individuals and upon other factors such as the characteristics of the food and size of the meal, and the process of digestion normally takes between 24 and 72 hours.

Digestion begins in the mouth with the secretion of saliva and its digestive enzymes. Food is formed into a bolus by the mechanical mastication and swallowed into the esophagus from where it enters the stomach through the action of peristalsis. Gastric juice contains hydrochloric acid and pepsin two chemicals that could damage the stomach lining, but mucus and bicarbonates are secreted to protect against this. In the stomach further release of enzymes break down the food further and this is combined with the churning action of the stomach. Mainly proteins are digested in stomach. The partially digested food enters the duodenum as a thick semi-liquid chyme. In the small intestine, the larger part of digestion takes place and this is helped by the secretions of bile, pancreatic juice and intestinal juice. The intestinal walls are lined with villi, and their epithelial cells are covered with numerous microvilli to improve the absorption of nutrients by increasing the surface area of the intestine. Bile helps in emulsification of fats and also activates lipases.

In the large intestine, the passage of food is slower to enable fermentation by the gut flora to take place. Here, water is absorbed and waste material stored as feces to be removed by defecation via the anal canal and anus.

=== Neural and biochemical control mechanisms ===
Different phases of digestion take place including: the cephalic phase, gastric phase, and intestinal phase.

The cephalic phase occurs at the sight, thought and smell of food, which stimulate the cerebral cortex. Taste and smell stimuli are sent to the hypothalamus and medulla oblongata. After this it is routed through the vagus nerve and release of acetylcholine. Gastric secretion at this phase rises to 40% of maximum rate. Acidity in the stomach is not buffered by food at this point and thus acts to inhibit parietal (secretes acid) and G cell (secretes gastrin) activity via D cell secretion of somatostatin.

The gastric phase takes 3 to 4 hours. It is stimulated by distension of the stomach, presence of food in stomach and decrease in pH. Distention activates long and myenteric reflexes. This activates the release of acetylcholine, which stimulates the release of more gastric juices. As protein enters the stomach, it binds to hydrogen ions, which raises the pH of the stomach. Inhibition of gastrin and gastric acid secretion is lifted. This triggers G cells to release gastrin, which in turn stimulates parietal cells to secrete gastric acid. Gastric acid is about 0.5% hydrochloric acid, which lowers the pH to the desired pH of 1–3. Acid release is also triggered by acetylcholine and histamine.

The intestinal phase has two parts, the excitatory and the inhibitory. Partially digested food fills the duodenum. This triggers intestinal gastrin to be released. Enterogastric reflex inhibits vagal nuclei, activating sympathetic fibers causing the pyloric sphincter to tighten to prevent more food from entering, and inhibits local reflexes.

== Breakdown into nutrients ==
=== Protein digestion ===
Protein digestion occurs in the stomach and duodenum in which three main enzymes, pepsin secreted by the stomach and trypsin and chymotrypsin secreted by the pancreas, break down food proteins into polypeptides that are then broken down by various exopeptidases and dipeptidases into amino acids. The digestive enzymes however are mostly secreted as their inactive precursors, the zymogens. For example, trypsin is secreted by pancreas in the form of trypsinogen, which is activated in the duodenum by enterokinase to form trypsin. Trypsin then cleaves proteins to smaller polypeptides.

=== Fat digestion ===
Digestion of some fats can begin in the mouth where lingual lipase breaks down some short chain lipids into diglycerides. However fats are mainly digested in the small intestine. The presence of fat in the small intestine produces hormones that stimulate the release of pancreatic lipase from the pancreas and bile from the liver which helps in the emulsification of fats for absorption of fatty acids. Complete digestion of one molecule of fat (a triglyceride) results a mixture of fatty acids, mono- and di-glycerides, but no glycerol.

=== Carbohydrate digestion ===
In humans, dietary starches are composed of glucose units arranged in long chains called amylose, a polysaccharide. During digestion, bonds between glucose molecules are broken by salivary and pancreatic amylase, resulting in progressively smaller chains of glucose. This results in simple sugars glucose and maltose (2 glucose molecules) that can be absorbed by the small intestine.

Lactase is an enzyme that breaks down the disaccharide lactose to its component parts, glucose and galactose. Glucose and galactose can be absorbed by the small intestine. Approximately 65 percent of the adult population produce only small amounts of lactase and are unable to eat unfermented milk-based foods. This is commonly known as lactose intolerance. Lactose intolerance varies widely by genetic heritage; more than 90 percent of peoples of east Asian descent are lactose intolerant, in contrast to about 5 percent of people of northern European descent.

Sucrase is an enzyme that breaks down the disaccharide sucrose, commonly known as table sugar, cane sugar, or beet sugar. Sucrose digestion yields the sugars fructose and glucose which are readily absorbed by the small intestine.

=== DNA and RNA digestion ===
DNA and RNA are broken down into mononucleotides by the nucleases deoxyribonuclease (DNase), and ribonuclease (RNase) from the pancreas.

== Non-destructive digestion ==
Some nutrients are complex molecules (for example vitamin B_{12}) which would be destroyed if they were broken down into their functional groups. To digest vitamin B_{12} non-destructively, haptocorrin in saliva strongly binds and protects the B_{12} molecules from stomach acid as they enter the stomach and are cleaved from their protein complexes.

After the B_{12}-haptocorrin complexes pass from the stomach via the pylorus to the duodenum, pancreatic proteases cleave haptocorrin from the B_{12} molecules which rebind to intrinsic factor (IF). These B_{12}-IF complexes travel to the ileum portion of the small intestine where cubilin receptors enable assimilation and circulation of B_{12}-IF complexes in the blood.

== Digestive hormones ==
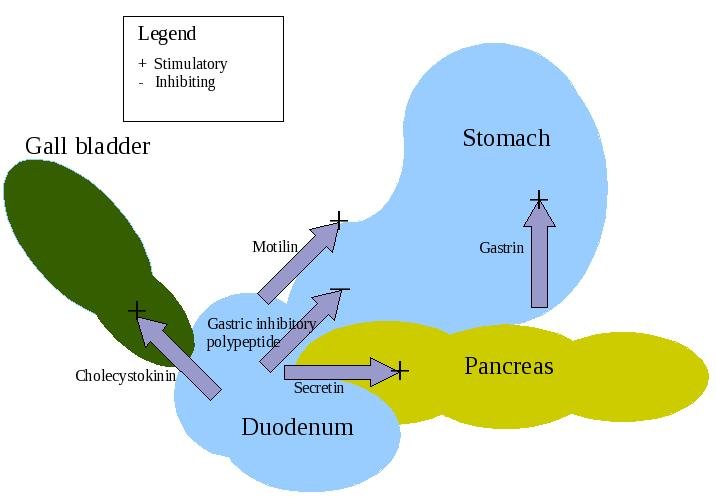
Action of the major digestive hormones

There are at least five hormones that aid and regulate the digestive system in mammals. There are variations across the vertebrates, as for instance in birds. Arrangements are complex and additional details are regularly discovered. Connections to metabolic control (largely the glucose-insulin system) have been uncovered.

- Gastrin – is in the stomach and stimulates the gastric glands to secrete pepsinogen (an inactive form of the enzyme pepsin) and hydrochloric acid. Secretion of gastrin is stimulated by food arriving in stomach. The secretion is inhibited by low pH.
- Secretin – is in the duodenum and signals the secretion of sodium bicarbonate in the pancreas and it stimulates the bile secretion in the liver. This hormone responds to the acidity of the chyme.
- Cholecystokinin (CCK) – is in the duodenum and stimulates the release of digestive enzymes in the pancreas and stimulates the emptying of bile in the gall bladder. This hormone is secreted in response to fat in chyme.
- Gastric inhibitory peptide (GIP) – is in the duodenum and decreases the stomach churning in turn slowing the emptying in the stomach. Another function is to induce insulin secretion.
- Motilin – is in the duodenum and increases the migrating myoelectric complex component of gastrointestinal motility and stimulates the production of pepsin.

== Significance of pH ==
Digestion is a complex process controlled by several factors. pH plays a crucial role in a normally functioning digestive tract. In the mouth, pharynx and esophagus, pH is typically about 6.8, very weakly acidic. Saliva controls pH in this region of the digestive tract. Salivary amylase is contained in saliva and starts the breakdown of carbohydrates into monosaccharides. Most digestive enzymes are sensitive to pH and will denature in a high or low pH environment.

The stomach's high acidity inhibits the breakdown of carbohydrates within it. This acidity confers two benefits: it denatures proteins for further digestion in the small intestines, and provides non-specific immunity, damaging or eliminating various pathogens.

In the small intestines, the duodenum provides critical pH balancing to activate digestive enzymes. The liver secretes bile into the duodenum to neutralize the acidic conditions from the stomach, and the pancreatic duct empties into the duodenum, adding bicarbonate to neutralize the acidic chyme, thus creating a neutral environment. The mucosal tissue of the small intestines is alkaline with a pH of about 8.5.

== See also ==
- Digestive system of gastropods
- Digestive system of humpback whales
- Evolution of the mammalian digestive system
- Discovery and development of proton pump inhibitors
- Erepsin
- Gastroesophageal reflux disease
