= Gastrointestinal physiology =

Study of the physical function of the gut

Gastrointestinal physiology is the branch of human physiology that addresses the physical function of the gastrointestinal (GI) tract. The function of the GI tract is to process ingested food by mechanical and chemical means, extract nutrients and excrete waste products. The GI tract is composed of the alimentary canal, that runs from the mouth to the anus, as well as the associated glands, chemicals, hormones, and enzymes that assist in digestion. The major processes that occur in the GI tract are: motility, secretion, regulation, digestion and circulation. The proper function and coordination of these processes are vital for maintaining good health by providing for the effective digestion and uptake of nutrients.

== Gut motility ==
The gastrointestinal tract generates gut motility using smooth muscle subunits linked by gap junctions. These subunits fire spontaneously in either a tonic or a phasic fashion. Tonic contractions are those contractions that are maintained from several minutes up to hours at a time. These occur in the sphincters of the tract, as well as in the anterior stomach. The other type of contractions, called phasic contractions, consist of brief periods of both relaxation and contraction, occurring in the posterior stomach and the small intestine, and are carried out by the muscularis externa.

Motility may be overactive (hypermotility), leading to diarrhea, or underactive (hypomotility), leading to constipation. Either may cause abdominal pain or vomiting.

=== Stimulation ===
The stimulation for these contractions likely originates in modified smooth muscle cells called interstitial cells of Cajal. These cells cause spontaneous cycles of slow wave potentials that can cause action potentials in smooth muscle cells. They are associated with the contractile smooth muscle via gap junctions. These slow wave potentials must reach a threshold level for the action potential to occur, whereupon Ca^{2+} channels on the smooth muscle open and an action potential occurs. As the contraction is graded based upon how much Ca^{2+} enters the cell, the longer the duration of the slow wave, the more action potentials occur. This, in turn, results in greater contraction force from the smooth muscle. Both amplitude and duration of the slow waves can be modified based upon the presence of neurotransmitters, hormones or other paracrine signaling. The number of slow wave potentials per minute varies based upon the location in the digestive tract. This number ranges from 3 waves/min in the stomach to 12 waves/min in the intestines.

=== Contraction patterns ===
The peristalsis and segmentation, detailed below and pendular movement are famous examples of distinct patterns of GI contraction. Occurring between meals, the migrating motor complex is a series of peristaltic wave cycles in distinct phases starting with relaxation, followed by an increasing level of activity to a peak level of peristaltic activity lasting for 5 to 15 minutes. This cycle repeats every 1.5 to 2 hours but is interrupted by food ingestion. The role of this process is likely to clean excess bacteria and food from the digestive system.

==== Peristalsis ====
Peristalsis animation

Peristalsis is one of the patterns that occur during and shortly after a meal. The contractions occur in wave patterns traveling down short lengths of the GI tract from one section to the next. The contractions occur directly behind the bolus of food that is in the system, forcing it toward the anus into the next relaxed section of smooth muscle. This relaxed section then contracts, generating smooth forward movement of the bolus at between 2 and 25 cm/s. This contraction pattern depends upon hormones, paracrine signals, and the autonomic nervous system for proper regulation.

==== Segmentation ====
Segmentation contractions also occur during and shortly after a meal within short lengths in segmented or random patterns along the intestine. This process is carried out by the longitudinal muscles relaxing while circular muscles contract at alternating sections thereby mixing the food. This mixing allows food and digestive enzymes to maintain a uniform composition, as well as to ensure contact with the epithelium for proper absorption.

== Secretion ==
Every day, seven liters of fluid are secreted by the digestive system. This fluid is composed of four primary components: ions, digestive enzymes, mucus, and bile. About half of these fluids are secreted by the salivary glands, pancreas, and liver, which compose the accessory digestive organs of the digestive system. The rest of the fluid is secreted by the GI epithelial cells.

=== Ions ===
The largest component of secreted fluids is ions and water, which are first secreted and then reabsorbed along the tract. The ions secreted primarily consist of H^{+}, K^{+}, Cl^{−}, HCO_{3}^{−} and Na^{+}. Water follows the movement of these ions. The GI tract accomplishes this ion pumping using a system of proteins that are capable of active transport, facilitated diffusion and open channel ion movement. The arrangement of these proteins on the apical and basolateral sides of the epithelium determines the net movement of ions and water in the tract.

H^{+} and Cl^{−} are secreted by the parietal cells into the lumen of the stomach creating acidic conditions with a low pH of 1. H^{+} is pumped into the stomach by exchanging it with K^{+}. This process also requires ATP as a source of energy; however, Cl^{−} then follows the positive charge in the H^{+} through an open apical channel protein.

HCO_{3}^{−} secretion occurs to neutralize the acid secretions that make their way into the duodenum of the small intestine. Most of the HCO_{3}^{−} comes from pancreatic acinar cells in the form of NaHCO_{3} in an aqueous solution. This is the result of the high concentration of both HCO_{3}^{−} and Na^{+} present in the duct creating an osmotic gradient to which the water follows.

=== Digestive enzymes ===
The second vital secretion of the GI tract is that of digestive enzymes that are secreted in the mouth, stomach and intestines. Some of these enzymes are secreted by accessory digestive organs, while others are secreted by the epithelial cells of the stomach and intestine. While some of these enzymes remain embedded in the wall of the GI tract, others are secreted in an inactive proenzyme form. When these proenzymes reach the lumen of the tract, a factor specific to a particular proenzyme will activate it. A prime example of this is pepsin, which is secreted in the stomach by chief cells. Pepsin in its secreted form is inactive (pepsinogen). However, once it reaches the gastric lumen it becomes activated into pepsin by the high H+ concentration, becoming an enzyme vital to digestion. The release of the enzymes is regulated by neural, hormonal, or paracrine signals. However, in general, parasympathetic stimulation increases secretion of all digestive enzymes.

=== Mucus ===
Mucus is released in the stomach and intestine, and serves to lubricate and protect the inner mucosa of the tract. It is composed of a specific family of glycoproteins termed mucins and is generally very viscous. Mucus is made by two types of specialized cells termed mucous cells in the stomach and goblet cells in the intestines. Signals for increased mucus release include parasympathetic innervations, immune system response and enteric nervous system messengers.

=== Bile ===
Bile is secreted into the duodenum of the small intestine via the common bile duct. It is produced in liver cells and stored in the gall bladder until release during a meal. Bile is formed of three elements: bile salts, bilirubin and cholesterol. Bilirubin is a waste product of the breakdown of hemoglobin. The cholesterol present is secreted with the feces. The bile salt component is an active non-enzymatic substance that facilitates fat absorption by helping it to form an emulsion with water due to its amphoteric nature. These salts are formed in the hepatocytes from bile acids combined with an amino acid. Other compounds such as the waste products of drug degradation are also present in the bile.

== Regulation ==
The digestive system has a complex system of motility and secretion regulation which is vital for proper function. This task is accomplished via a system of long reflexes from the central nervous system (CNS), short reflexes from the enteric nervous system (ENS) and reflexes from GI peptides working in harmony with each other.

=== Long reflexes ===
Long reflexes to the digestive system involve a sensory neuron sending information to the brain, which integrates the signal and then sends messages to the digestive system. While in some situations, the sensory information comes from the GI tract itself; in others, information is received from sources other than the GI tract. When the latter situation occurs, these reflexes are called feedforward reflexes. This type of reflex includes reactions to food or danger triggering effects in the GI tract. Emotional responses can also trigger GI response such as the butterflies in the stomach feeling when nervous. The feedforward and emotional reflexes of the GI tract are considered cephalic reflexes.

=== Short reflexes ===
Control of the digestive system is also maintained by ENS, which can be thought of as a digestive brain that can help to regulate motility, secretion and growth. Sensory information from the digestive system can be received, integrated and acted upon by the enteric system alone. When this occurs, the reflex is called a short reflex. Although this may be the case in several situations, the ENS can also work in conjunction with the CNS; vagal afferents from the viscera are received by the medulla, efferents are affected by the vagus nerve. When this occurs, the reflex is called vagovagal reflex. The myenteric plexus and submucosal plexus are both located in the gut wall and receive sensory signals from the lumen of the gut or the CNS.

=== Gastrointestinal peptides ===
GI peptides are signal molecules that are released into the blood by the GI cells themselves. They act on a variety of tissues including the brain, digestive accessory organs, and the GI tract. The effects range from excitatory or inhibitory effects on motility and secretion to feelings of satiety or hunger when acting on the brain. These hormones fall into three major categories, the gastrin and secretin families, with the third composed of all the other hormones unlike those in the other two families. Further information on the GI peptides is summarized in the table below.

General GI peptide information
	Secreted by	Target	Effects on endocrine secretion	Effects on exocrine secretion	Effects on motility	Other effects	Stimulus for release
Gastrin	G cells in stomach	ECL cells; parietal cells	None	Increases acid secretion, increases mucus growth	Stimulates gastric contraction	None	Peptides and amino acids in lumen; gastrin releasing peptide and ACh in nervous reflexes
Cholecystokinin (CCK)	Endocrine I cells of the small intestine; neurons of the brain and gut	Gallbladder, pancreas, gastric smooth muscle	None	Stimulates pancreatic enzyme and HCO3- secretion	Stimulates gallbladder contraction; inhibits stomach emptying	Satiety	Fatty acids and some amino acids
Secretin	Endocrine S cells of the small intestine	Pancreas, stomach	None	Stimulates pancreatic and hepatic HCO3- secretion; inhibits acid secretion; pancreatic growth	Stimulates gallbladder contraction; Inhibits stomach emptying	None	Acid in small intestine
Gastric inhibitory Peptide	Endocrine K cells of the small intestine	Beta cells of the pancreas	Stimulates pancreatic insulin release	Inhibits acid secretion	None	Satiety and lipid metabolism	Glucose, fatty acid, and amino acids in small intestine
Motilin	Endocrine M cells in small intestine	Smooth muscle of stomach and duodenum	None	None	Stimulates migrating motor complex	Action in brain, stimulates migratory motor complex	Fasting: cyclic release every 1.5–2 hours by neural stimulus
Glucagon-like peptide-1	Endocrine cells in small intestine	Endocrine pancreas	Stimulates insulin release; inhibits glucagon release	Possibly inhibits acid secretion	Slows gastric emptying	Satiety; various CNS functions	Mixed meals of fats and carbohydrates

== Digestion ==
- carbohydrates (monosaccharide, disaccharide)
- proteins
- lipids

== Splanchnic circulation ==
- Superior mesenteric artery
- Inferior mesenteric artery
