= Vagovagal reflex =

Reflex circuits in the gastrointestinal tract

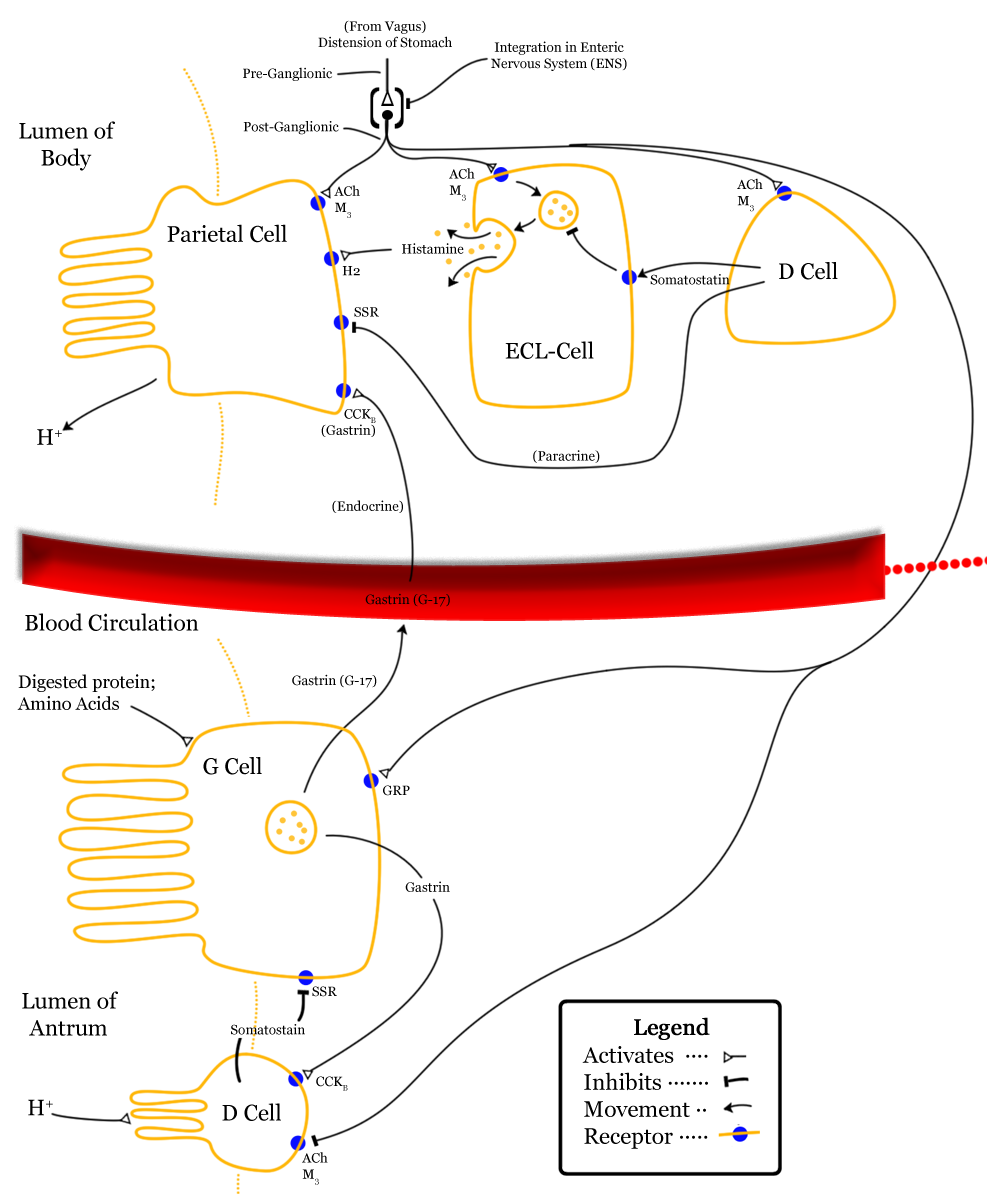
- Control of stomach acid secretions. (ECL-cell at top center.)

Identifiers
- TH: H3.04.02.0.00030

Vagovagal reflex refers to gastrointestinal tract reflex circuits where afferent and efferent fibers of the vagus nerve coordinate responses to gut stimuli via the dorsal vagal complex in the brain. The vagovagal reflex controls contraction of the gastrointestinal muscle layers in response to distension of the tract by food. This reflex also allows for the accommodation of large amounts of food in the gastrointestinal tracts.

The vagus nerve, composed of both sensory afferents and parasympathetic efferents, carries signals from stretch receptors, osmoreceptors, and chemoreceptors to dorsal vagal complex where the signal may be further transmitted to autonomic centers in the medulla. Efferent fibers of the vagus then carry signals to the gastrointestinal tract up to two-thirds of the transverse colon (coinciding with the second GI watershed point).

== Function ==
The vagovagal reflex is active during the receptive relaxation of the stomach in response to swallowing of food (prior to it reaching the stomach). When food enters the stomach a "vagovagal" reflex goes from the stomach to the brain, and then back again to the stomach causing active relaxation of the smooth muscle in the stomach wall. If vagal innervation is interrupted then intra-gastric pressure increases. This is a potential cause of vomiting due to the inability of the proximal stomach smooth muscle to undergo receptive relaxation.

The vagal afferents are activated during the gastric phase of digestion when the corpus and fundus of the stomach are distended secondary to the entry of a food bolus. The stimulation of the mechanical receptors located in the gastric mucosa stimulates the vagus afferents. The completion of the reflex circuit by vagus efferents leads to the stimulation of postganglionic muscarinic nerves. These nerves release acetylcholine to stimulate two end effects. One, the parietal cells in the body of the stomach are stimulated to release H^{+}. Two, the ECL cells of the lamina propria of the body of the stomach are stimulated to release histamine. Vagal stimulation of the peptidergic neurons, occurring simultaneously, leads to the release of gastrin-releasing-peptide. Finally, the Delta cells are inhibited to reduce the inhibition of gastrin release.
