= Dorsal nucleus of vagus nerve =

Neuron cluster in the brainstem

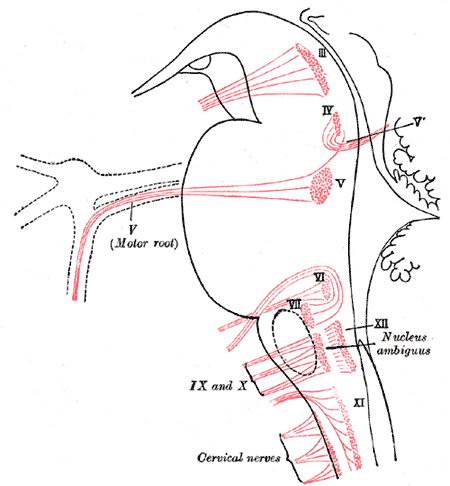
- Nuclei of origin of cranial motor nerves schematically represented; lateral view. ("X" visible at bottom center.)

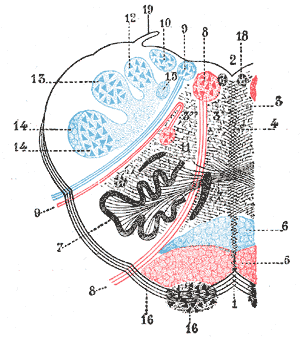
- #9 is vagus nerve and nucleus

Details

Identifiers
- Latin: nucleus posterior nervi vagi, nucleus dorsalis nervi vagi
- NeuroNames: 755
- NeuroLex ID: birnlex_2642
- TA98: A14.1.04.229
- TA2: 6013
- FMA: 54585

The dorsal nucleus of vagus nerve (or posterior nucleus of vagus nerve or dorsal vagal nucleus or nucleus dorsalis nervi vagi or nucleus posterior nervi vagi) is a cranial nerve nucleus of the vagus nerve (CN X) situated in the medulla oblongata of the brainstem ventral to the floor of the fourth ventricle. It contains nerve cell bodies of parasympathetic neurons of CN X that provide parasympathetic innervation to the gastrointestinal tract and lungs as well as other thoracic and abdominal organs. These functions include, among others, bronchoconstriction and gland secretion.

Cell bodies of pre-ganglionic parasympathetic neurons of CN X that innervate the heart meanwhile reside in the nucleus ambiguus, and additional cell bodies of the nucleus ambiguus give rise to the branchial efferent motor fibers of the vagus nerve (CN X) terminating in the laryngeal, and pharyngeal muscles, and musculus uvulae muscle.

== Additional images ==
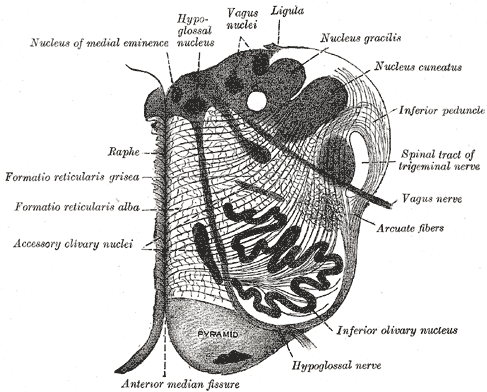
Section of the medulla oblongata at about the middle of the olive.

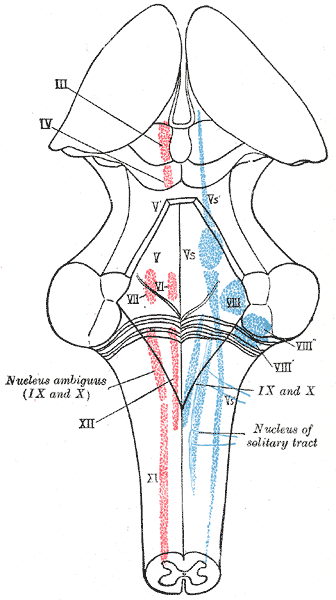
The cranial nerve nuclei schematically represented; dorsal view. Motor nuclei in red; sensory in blue.

Dorsal motor nucleus of Vagus with Lewy body pathology

== See also ==
- Vagovagal reflex, gastrointestinal tract reflex circuits where afferent and efferent fibers of the vagus nerve.
- Nucleus ambiguus
