= Basal electrical rhythm =

The basal or basic electrical rhythm (BER) or electrical control activity (ECA) is the spontaneous depolarization and repolarization of pacemaker cells known as interstitial cells of Cajal (ICCs) in the smooth muscle of the stomach, small intestine, and large intestine. This electrical rhythm is spread through gap junctions in the smooth muscle of the GI tract. These pacemaker cells, also called the ICCs, control the frequency of contractions in the gastrointestinal tract. The cells can be located in either the circular or longitudinal layer of the smooth muscle in the GI tract; circular for the small and large intestine, longitudinal for the stomach. The frequency of contraction differs at each location in the GI tract beginning with 3 per minute in the stomach, then 12 per minute in the duodenum, 9 per minute in the ileum, and a normally low one contraction per 30 minutes in the large intestines that increases 3 to 4 times a day due to a phenomenon called mass movement. The basal electrical rhythm controls the frequency of contraction but additional neuronal and hormonal controls regulate the strength of each contraction.

== Physiology ==
Smooth muscle within the GI tract causes the involuntary peristaltic motion that moves consumed food down the esophagus and towards the rectum. The smooth muscle throughout most of the GI tract is divided into two layers: an outer longitudinal layer and an inner circular layer. Both layers of muscle are located within the muscularis externa. The stomach has a third layer: an innermost oblique layer.

The physical contractions of the smooth muscle cells can be caused by action potentials in efferent motor neurons of the enteric nervous system, or by receptor mediated calcium influx. These efferent motor neurons of the enteric nervous system are cholinergic and adrenergic neurons. The inner circular layer is innervated by both excitatory and inhibitory motor neurons, while the outer longitudinal layer is innervated by mainly excitatory neurons. These action potentials cause the smooth muscle cells to contract or relax, depending on the particular stimulation the cells receive. Longitudinal muscle fibers depend on calcium influx into the cell for excitation-contraction coupling, while circular muscle fibers rely on intracellular calcium release. Contraction of the smooth muscle can occur when the BER reaches its plateau (an absolute value less than -45mV) while a simultaneous stimulatory action potential occurs. A contraction will not occur unless an action potential occurs. Generally, BER waves stimulate action potentials and action potentials stimulate contractions.

The interstitial cells of Cajal are specialized pacemaker cells located in the wall of the stomach, small intestine, and large intestine. These cells are connected to the smooth muscle via gap junctions and the myenteric plexus. The cell membranes of the pacemaker cells undergo a rhythmic depolarization and repolarization from -65mV to -45mV. This rhythm of depolarization-repolarization of the cell membrane creates a slow wave known as a BER, and it is transmitted to the smooth muscle cells. The frequency of these depolarizations in a region of the GI tract determines the possible frequency of contractions. In order for a contraction to occur, a hormone or neurocrine signal must induce the smooth muscle cell to have an action potential. The basal electrical rhythm allows the smooth muscle cell to depolarize and contract rhythmically when exposed to hormonal signals. This action potential is transmitted to other smooth muscle cells via gap junctions, creating a peristaltic wave.

The specific mechanism for the contraction of smooth muscle in the GI tract depends upon IP3R calcium release channels in the muscle. Calcium release from IP3 sensitive calcium stores activates calcium dependent chloride channels. These chloride channels trigger spontaneous transient inward current which couples the calcium oscillations to electrical activity.

== Factors that impact gastric motility ==
The number of action potentials during the plateau of a particular BER slow wave can vary. This variation in action potential generation does not impact the frequency of waves through the GI tract, only the strength of those contractile waves.

Factors that impact gastric motility are:

- Gastrin - Stimulates increased contraction force and motility in the stomach, small intestine, and large intestine.
- CCK - Suppresses motility in the stomach and duodenum Additionally, CCK stimulates secretion of PPY and inhibits the secretion of ghrelin.
- PPY - inhibition of upper GI tract motility
- GLP-1 - Functions as an "Ileal Brake" to inhibit upper GI tract motility when the distal gut is exposed to unabsorbed nutrients. Slows gastric emptying to promote nutrient absorption.
- Distension of the stomach increases motility of the stomach.
- Distension of the duodenum inhibits stomach motility in order to prevent the over filling of the duodenum.
- Presence of fat, low pH, and hypertonic solutions cause a decrease in motility of the stomach.
- Sympathetic nervous system innervation inhibits gastric motility.
- Parasympathetic nervous system innervation stimulates gastric motility.
- Rate and motility are also dependent upon the meal composition. Meals that are solid and contain a greater macronutrient composition require slower and more forceful contraction in order to extract the maximum amount of nutrients throughout the GI tract.

The cells that respond to and secrete these substances include I cells and K cells in the proximal small intestine, whose stimulation is dependent on nutrient exposure and entry into the duodenum, and L cells in the distal small intestine and colon which are stimulated by unabsorbed nutrients and gastric emptying.

The frequency of the BER, and thus the contractions, changes throughout the GI tract. The frequency in the stomach is 3 per minute, while the duodenum is 11 to 12 per minute and the ileum is 9 per minute.

== See also ==
- Neurogastroenterology

== Sources ==
- Widmaier, Eric P.; Raff, Hershel; Strang, Kevin T. (2016). Vander's Human Physiology: The Mechanisms of Body Function. McGraw-Hill Education. ISBN 978-1-259-25110-8.
