= Segmentation contractions =

Segmentation contractions (or movements) are a type of intestinal motility.

Unlike peristalsis, which predominates in the esophagus, segmentation contractions occur in the large intestine and small intestine, while predominating in the latter. While peristalsis involves one-way motion in the caudal direction, segmentation contractions move chyme in both directions, which allows greater mixing with the secretions of the intestines. Segmentation involves contractions of the circular muscles in the digestive tract, while peristalsis involves rhythmic contractions of the longitudinal muscles in the gastrointestinal tract. Unlike peristalsis, segmentation actually can slow progression of chyme through the system.
