= Myenteric plexus =

Part of the enteric nervous system

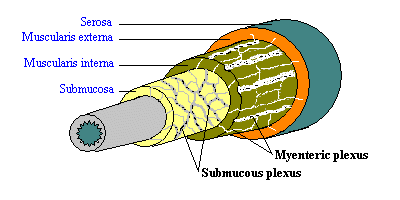
- The myenteric plexus shown in the muscular layer of the gastrointestinal tract

Details

Identifiers
- Latin: plexus myentericus, plexus Auerbachi
- MeSH: D009197
- TA98: A14.3.03.041
- TA2: 6727

The myenteric plexus (or Auerbach's plexus) provides motor innervation to both layers of the muscular layer of the gut, having both parasympathetic and sympathetic input (although present ganglion cell bodies belong to parasympathetic innervation, fibers from sympathetic innervation also reach the plexus), whereas the submucous plexus provides secretomotor innervation to the mucosa nearest the lumen of the gut.

Like other enteric neurons, myenteric neurons are derived from the vagal neural crest. The myenteric plexus is the major nerve supply to the gastrointestinal tract and controls GI tract motility.

According to preclinical studies, 30% of myenteric plexus' neurons are enteric sensory neurons, thus Auerbach's plexus has also a sensory component.

== Structure ==
A part of the enteric nervous system, the myenteric plexus exists between the longitudinal and circular layers of muscularis externa in the gastrointestinal tract. It is found in the muscles of the esophagus, stomach, and intestine.

The ganglia have properties similar to the central nervous system (CNS). These properties include presence of glia, interneurons, a small extracellular space, dense synaptic neuropil, isolation from blood vessels, multiple synaptic mechanisms and multiple neurotransmitters.

They contain Dogiel cells.

== Function ==
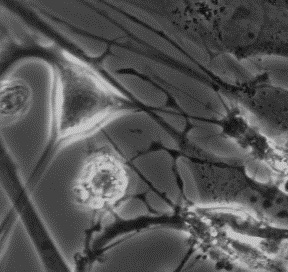
Interstitial cell of Cajal shown in the myenteric plexus of a mouse embryo

The myenteric plexus functions as a part of the enteric nervous system (digestive system). The enteric nervous system (ENS) can and does function autonomously, but normal digestive function requires communication links between this intrinsic system and the central nervous system. The ENS contains sensory receptors, primary afferent neurons, interneurons, and motor neurons. The events that are controlled, at least in part, by the ENS are multiple and include motor activity, secretion, absorption, blood flow, and interaction with other organs such as the gallbladder or pancreas. These links take the form of parasympathetic and sympathetic fibers that connect either the central and enteric nervous systems or connect the central nervous system directly with the digestive tract. Through these cross connections, the gut can provide sensory information to the CNS, and the CNS can affect gastrointestinal function. Connection to the central nervous system also means that signals from outside of the digestive system can be relayed to the digestive system: for instance, the sight of appealing food stimulates secretion in the stomach.

Myenteric interstitial cells of Cajal serve as pacemaker cells that generate the basal electrical rhythm, slow waves that control peristalsis and segmental contractons.

=== Neurotransmitters ===
The enteric nervous system makes use of over 30 different neurotransmitters, most similar to those of the CNS such as acetylcholine, dopamine, and serotonin. More than 90% of the body's serotonin lies in the gut; as well as about 50% of the body's dopamine, which is currently being studied to further our understanding of its utility in the brain. The heavily studied neuropeptide known as substance P is present in significant levels and may help facilitate the production of saliva, smooth muscle contractions, and other tissue responses.

==== Receptors ====
Since many of the same neurotransmitters are found in the ENS as the brain, it follows that myenteric neurons can express receptors for both peptide and non-peptide (amines, amino acids, purines) neurotransmitters. Generally, expression of a receptor is limited to a subset of myenteric neurons, with probably the only exception being expression of nicotinic cholinergic receptors on all myenteric neurons. One receptor that has been targeted for therapeutic reasons has been the 5-hydroxytryptamine (5-HT_{4}) receptor. Activating this pre-synaptic receptor enhances cholinergic neurotransmission and can stimulate gastrointestinal motility.

The enteric nervous system exhibits taste receptors similar to the ones in the tongue. The taste receptor TAS1R3 and the taste G protein gustducin are two of the most common. These receptors sense "sweetness" on the tongue and sense glucose in the enteric nervous system. These receptors help regulate the secretion of insulin and other hormones that are responsible for controlling blood sugar levels.

== Clinical significance ==
Hirschsprung's disease is a congenital disorder of the colon in which nerve cells of the myenteric plexus in its walls, also known as ganglion cells, are absent. Hirschsprung's disease is a form of functional low bowel obstruction due to failure of caudal migration of neuroblasts within developing bowel – this results in an absence of parasympathetic intrinsic ganglion cells in both Auerbach's and Meissner's plexuses. The distal large bowel from the point of neuronal arrest to the anus is continuously aganglionic. It is a rare disorder (1:5000), with prevalence among males being four times that of females.

Achalasia is a motor disorder of the esophagus characterized by decrease in ganglion cell density in the myenteric plexus. The cause of the lesion is unknown.

=== Role in CNS disorders ===
Because the ENS is known as the "brain of the gut", due to its similarities with the CNS, researchers have been using colonic biopsies of Parkinson's patients to help better understand and manage Parkinson's disease. PD patients are known to experience severe constipation due to GI tract dysfunction years before the onset of motor movement complications, which characterises Parkinson's disease.

== History ==
Leopold Auerbach, a neuropathologist, was one of the first to further research the nervous system using histological staining methods.

== Additional images ==
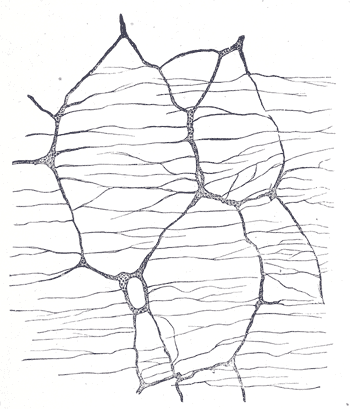
The myenteric plexus from the rabbit. X 50.
