= Chyme =

Semi-fluid mass of partially digested food

Identifiers
- FMA: 62961

Chyme or chymus (/ˈkaɪməs/; from Ancient Greek χυμός (khumós) 'juice') is the semi-fluid mass of partly digested food and digestive secretions that is formed in and expelled by the stomach, through the pyloric valve, into the duodenum (the beginning of the small intestine), where it is further transformed. Chyme also contains cells from the mouth and esophagus that slough off from the mechanical action of chewing and swallowing.

Chyme results from the mechanical and chemical breakdown of a bolus and consists of partially digested food, water, hydrochloric acid, and various digestive enzymes. Chyme slowly passes through the pyloric sphincter and into the duodenum, where the extraction of nutrients begins. Depending on the quantity and contents of the meal, the stomach will digest the food into chyme in some time from 40 minutes to 3 hours. With a pH of approximately 2, chyme emerging from the stomach is very acidic. The duodenum, a short section of the small intestine located between the stomach and the rest of the small intestine, secretes a hormone, cholecystokinin (CCK), which causes the gallbladder to contract, releasing alkaline bile into the duodenum and increasing the chyme's low pH. CCK also causes the release of digestive enzymes from the pancreas. The duodenum also produces the hormone secretin to stimulate the pancreatic secretion of large amounts of sodium bicarbonate, which then raises pH of the chyme to 7. Other secretions from the liver and from glands in the intestinal wall help in digestion, as these secretions contain a variety of digestive enzymes and chemicals that assist in the breakdown of complex compounds into those that can be absorbed and used by the body.

The linings of the stomach and duodenum are protected by a thick layer of mucus and, in the duodenum, the neutralizing actions of the sodium bicarbonate and bile. Afterward, at a pH of 7, the enzymes that were present from the stomach are no longer active. The chyme moves through the jejunum and the ileum, where digestion progresses, and the indigestible portion continues onward into the large intestine, where anaerobic bacteria break down any proteins and starches in chyme that were not digested fully in the small intestine and at the same time help to package the remains. These bacteria also help synthesize vitamin B and vitamin K, which will be absorbed along with other nutrients. When all of the nutrients have been absorbed from chyme, the remaining waste material changes into semisolid feces. The feces pass to the rectum, to be stored until ready to be discharged from the body during defecation.

== Uses ==
The chyme of an unweaned calf is the defining ingredient of pajata, a traditional recipe from Rome. Chyme is also sometimes used in Pinapaitan, a bitter Ilocano stew.

== See also ==
- Bolus
- Vomiting
