= List of side effects of tramadol =

The most common side effects of tramadol in order of decreasing incidence are:
Note: Serious adverse effects are in bold.

== Very common (>10% frequency) ==
- Dizziness
- Nausea
- Constipation
- Vertigo
- Headache
- Vomiting
- Somnolence (drowsiness)

== Common (1–10% frequency) ==
- Agitation
- Anxiety
- Emotional lability
- Euphoria
- Nervousness
- Spasticity
- Dyspepsia (indigestion)
- Asthenia (weakness)
- Pruritus (itchiness)
- Dry mouth
- Diarrhea
- Fatigue
- Sweating
- Malaise
- Vasodilation (dilation (widening) of blood vessels)
- Confusion
- Coordination disturbance
- Miosis
- Sleep disorder
- Rash
- Hypertonia
- Abdominal pain
- Weight loss
- Visual disturbance
- Flatulence
- Menopausal symptoms
- Urinary frequency
- **Urinary retention** (being unable to urinate)

== Uncommon (0.1-1% incidence) ==
- **Cardiovascular regulation anomalies** (palpitation, tachycardia, postural hypotension or cardiovascular collapse)
- Retching
- Gastrointestinal irritation (a feeling of pressure in the stomach, bloating)
- Urticaria (hives)
- Trembling
- Flushing

== Rare (0.01–0.1% incidence) ==
- **Bradycardia**
- Hypertension (high blood pressure)
- Allergic reactions (e.g. dyspnoea (shortness of breath), bronchospasm, wheezing, angioneurotic oedema)
- **Anaphylaxis**
- Changes in appetite
- Paraesthesia (pins and needles)
- **Hallucinations**
- Tremor
- **Respiratory depression**
- **Epileptiform convulsions**
- Involuntary muscle contractions
- Abnormal coordination
- Syncope (fainting)
- Blurred vision
- Dyspnoea (shortness of breath)
- Tinnitus (ringing in the ears)
- Migraine
- **Stevens–Johnson syndrome/toxic epidermal necrolysis** (potentially fatal skin reactions)
- Motorial weakness
- Creatinine increase
- Elevated liver enzymes
- **Hepatitis** (liver swelling)
- Stomatitis (mouth swelling)
- **Liver failure**
- **Pulmonary oedema** (fluid in the lungs)
- **Gastrointestinal bleeding**
- **Pulmonary embolism**
- **Myocardial ischaemia** (lack of blood supply to the heart muscles)
- Speech disorders
- Haemoglobin decrease
- Proteinuria (protein in the urine; usually indicative of kidney damage)
