= Spatula Mundani =

Surgical device

The Spatula Mundani was a surgical device invented in the 17th century by the London surgeon James Woodall to treat extreme cases of severe constipation where purgatives had failed. Woodall believed that the cause of this malady was from scurvy, but speculation is that many of the cases were from the abuse of laudanum, a tincture of opium in alcohol commonly used at the time as a painkiller; opioid drugs are known to cause constipation by reducing gut motility. A drawing of the device is found in his 1617 book The Surgeons Mate.

The device was an iron tool slightly longer than 12 inches and consisted of a paddle at one end. The other end was spoon-shaped, with the center removed and a knob at the end. The spoon end was used to extract the "hard excrements" while the other was used for applying ointments, no doubt necessary after undergoing a procedure with this instrument.

The term mundani is apparently derived from the archaic term mundify which appeared in a dictionary from 1604 with the definition "to make clean".

On an archaeological dig at the Jamestown, Virginia, colonies a spatula mundani was found, and documents from 1608 report that it was part of a chest of surgeon's tools sent by Woodall to the colonies.

== See also ==
- Instruments used in general surgery
- Fecal impaction
