= Peristalsis =

Radially symmetrical contraction and relaxation of muscles

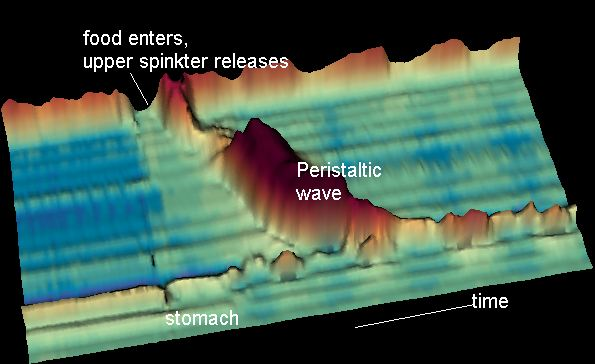
A time-space diagram of a peristaltic wave after a water swallow. High-pressure values are red, zero pressure is blue-green. The ridge in the upper part of the picture is the high pressure of the upper esophageal sphincter which only opens for a short time to let water pass.

Peristalsis (/ˌpɛrɪˈstælsɪs/ PERR-ih-STAL-siss, US also /-ˈstɔːl-/ -STAWL-) is a type of gut motility, characterized by radially symmetrical contraction and relaxation of muscles that propagate in a wave down a tube, in an anterograde direction. Peristalsis is progression of coordinated contraction of involuntary circular muscles, which is preceded by a simultaneous contraction of the longitudinal muscle and relaxation of the circular muscle in the lining of the gut.

In much of a digestive tract, such as the human gastrointestinal tract, smooth muscle tissue contracts in sequence to produce a peristaltic wave, which propels a ball of food (a food bolus) before being transformed into chyme in the stomach along the tract. The peristaltic movement comprises relaxation of circular smooth muscles, then their contraction behind the chewed material to keep it from moving backward, then longitudinal contraction to push it forward. Catastalsis is an obsolete term for the peristaltic wave.

Earthworms use a similar mechanism to drive their locomotion, and some modern machinery imitates this design.

The word comes from Neo-Latin and is derived from the Greek peristellein, "to wrap around," from peri-, "around" + stellein, "draw in, bring together; set in order".

== Human physiology ==
The myenteric plexus is an interconnected network of neurons that spans the part of the gastrointestinal tract from the esophagus to the rectum, and is responsible for the waves of peristalsis. The food bolus stretches the smooth muscle of the gut causing serotonin to be secreted that activate sensory neurons. These neurons, in turn, activate neurons of the myenteric plexus, which then split into two cholinergic pathways: a retrograde and an anterograde. Activated neurons of the retrograde pathway release substance P and acetylcholine to contract the smooth muscle behind the bolus. The activated neurons of the anterograde pathway release nitric oxide and vasoactive intestinal polypeptide to relax the smooth muscle caudal to the bolus. This allows the food bolus to effectively be pushed forward along the digestive tract. This peristaltic reflex is also known as the myenteric reflex.

=== Esophagus ===
After food is chewed into a bolus, it is swallowed and moved through the esophagus. Smooth muscles contract behind the bolus to prevent it from being squeezed back into the mouth. Then rhythmic, unidirectional waves of contractions work to rapidly force the food into the stomach. The migrating motor complex (MMC) helps trigger peristaltic waves. This process works in one direction only, and its sole esophageal function is to move food from the mouth into the stomach (the MMC also functions to clear out remaining food in the stomach to the small bowel and remaining particles in the small bowel into the colon).

A simplified image showing peristalsis

In the esophagus, two types of peristalsis occur:

- First, there is a primary peristaltic wave, which occurs when the bolus enters the esophagus during swallowing. The primary peristaltic wave forces the bolus down the esophagus and into the stomach in a wave lasting about 8–9 seconds. The wave travels down to the stomach even if the bolus of food descends at a greater rate than the wave itself, and continues even if for some reason the bolus gets stuck further up the esophagus.
- If the bolus gets stuck or moves slower than the primary peristaltic wave (as can happen when it is poorly lubricated), then stretch receptors in the esophageal lining are stimulated and a local reflex response causes a secondary peristaltic wave around the bolus, forcing it further down the esophagus, and these secondary waves continue indefinitely until the bolus enters the stomach. The process of peristalsis is controlled by the medulla oblongata. Esophageal peristalsis is typically assessed by performing an esophageal motility study.
- A third type of peristalsis, tertiary peristalsis, is dysfunctional and involves irregular, diffuse, simultaneous contractions. These contractions are suspect in esophageal dysmotility and present on a barium swallow as a "corkscrew esophagus".

During vomiting, the propulsion of food up the esophagus and out the mouth comes from the contraction of the abdominal muscles; peristalsis does not reverse in the esophagus.

=== Stomach ===
When a peristaltic wave reaches at the end of the esophagus, the cardiac sphincter (gastroesophageal sphincter) opens, allowing the passage of bolus into the stomach. The gastroesophageal sphincter normally remains closed and does not allow the stomach's food contents to move back. The churning movements of the stomach's thick muscular wall blend the food thoroughly with the acidic gastric juice, producing a mixture called the chyme. The muscularis layer of the stomach is thickest and maximum peristalsis occurs here. After short intervals, the pyloric sphincter keeps on opening and closing so the chyme is fed into the intestine in installments.

=== Small intestine ===
Once processed and digested by the stomach, the semifluid chyme is passed through the pyloric sphincter into the small intestine. Once past the stomach, a typical peristaltic wave lasts only a few seconds, traveling at only a few centimeters per second. Its primary purpose is to mix the chyme in the intestine rather than to move it forward in the intestine. Through this process of mixing and continued digestion and absorption of nutrients, the chyme gradually works its way through the small intestine to the large intestine.

In contrast to peristalsis, segmentation contractions result in that churning and mixing without pushing materials further down the digestive tract.

=== Large intestine ===
Although the large intestine has peristalsis of the type that the small intestine uses, it is not the primary propulsion. Instead, general contractions called mass action contractions occur one to three times per day in the large intestine, propelling the chyme (now feces) toward the rectum. Mass movements often tend to be triggered by meals, as the presence of chyme in the stomach and duodenum prompts them (gastrocolic reflex). Minimum peristalsis is found in the rectum part of the large intestine as a result of the thinnest muscularis layer.

=== Lymph ===
The human lymphatic system has no central pump. Instead, lymph circulates through peristalsis in the lymph capillaries and valves. Additionally, lymph circulation occurs via compression during contraction of adjacent skeletal muscle or via arterial pulsation.

=== Sperm ===
During ejaculation, the smooth muscle in the walls of the vasa deferentia contract reflexively in peristalsis, propelling sperm from the testicles to the urethra.

== Earthworms ==
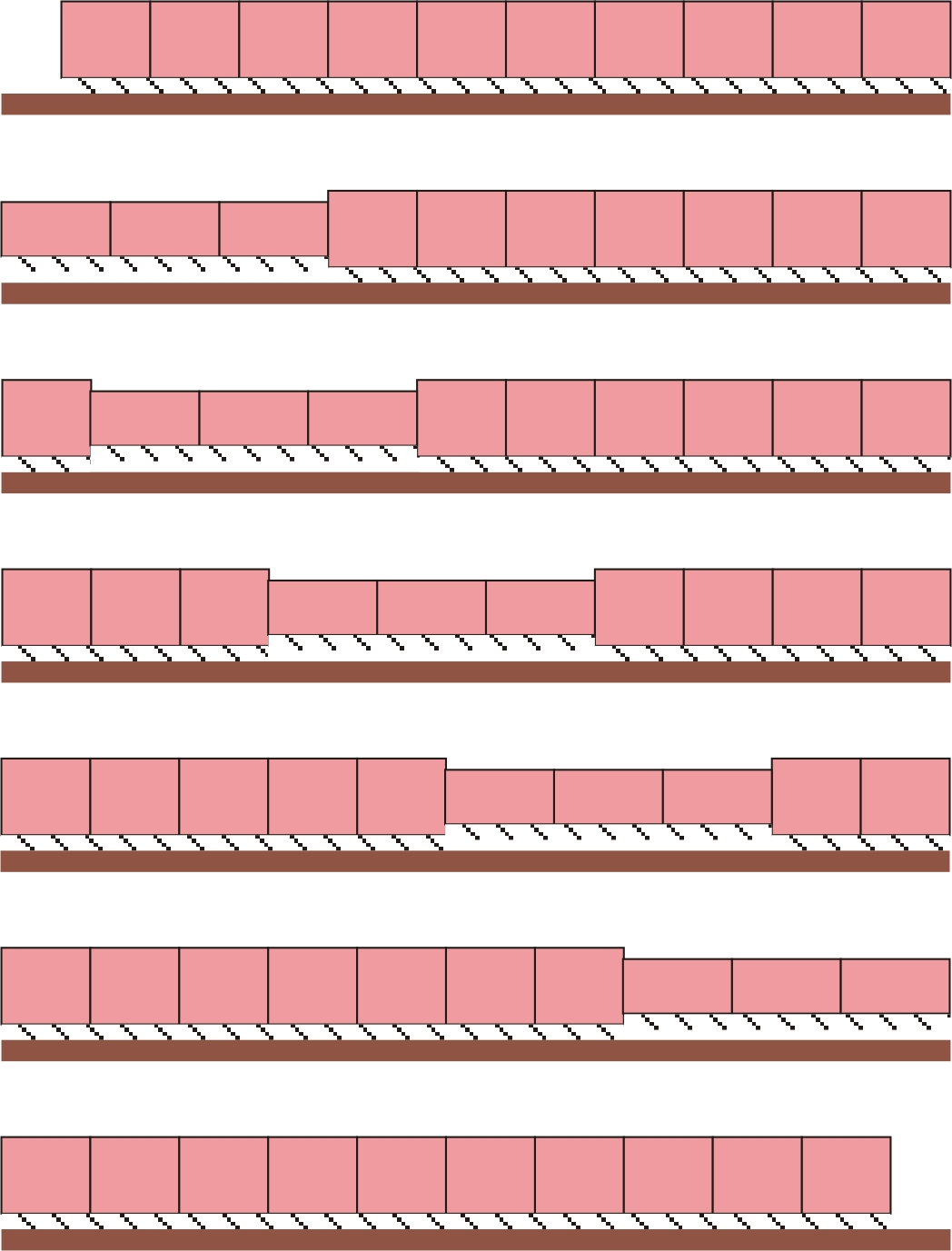
A simplified image showing Earthworm movement via peristalsis

The earthworm is a limbless annelid worm with a hydrostatic skeleton that moves by peristalsis. Its hydrostatic skeleton consists of a fluid-filled body cavity surrounded by an extensible body wall. The worm moves by radially constricting the anterior portion of its body, increasing length via hydrostatic pressure. This constricted region propagates posteriorly along the worm's body. As a result, each segment is extended forward, then relaxes and re-contacts the substrate, with hair-like setae preventing backward slipping. Various other invertebrates, such as caterpillars and millipedes, also move by peristalsis.

== Machinery ==
A peristaltic pump is a positive-displacement pump in which a motor pinches advancing portions of a flexible tube to propel a fluid within the tube. The pump isolates the fluid from the machinery, which is important if the fluid is abrasive or must remain sterile.

Robots have been designed that use peristalsis to achieve locomotion, as the earthworm uses it.

== Related terms ==
- Aperistalsis refers to a lack of propulsion. It can result from achalasia of the smooth muscle involved.
- Basal electrical rhythm is a slow wave of electrical activity that can initiate a contraction.
- Ileus is a disruption of the normal propulsive ability of the gastrointestinal tract caused by the failure of peristalsis.
- Retroperistalsis, the reverse of peristalsis
- Segmentation contractions are another type of intestinal motility.
- Intestinal desmosis, the atrophy of the tendinous plexus layer, may cause disturbed gut motility.
