= Constipation in children =

- Specialty: Pediatrics

Constipation in children refers to the medical condition of constipation in children. It is a functional gastrointestinal disorder.

== Presentation ==
Children have different bowel movement patterns than adults. In addition, there is a wide spectrum of normalcy when considering children's bowel habits. On average, infants have 3-4 bowel movements/day, and toddlers have 2-3 bowel movements per day. At around age 4, children develop an adult-like pattern of bowel movements (1-2 stools/day). The median onset of functional constipation in children is at 2.3 years old, with girls and boys being similarly affected. Children benefit from scheduled toilet breaks, once early in the morning and 30 minutes after meals. The Rome III Criteria for constipation in children can help to define and diagnose constipation for various age groups. Constipation in children may present as encopresis, or the inappropriate passage of stool (usually involuntarily) in inappropriate places. Stool can build up in the rectum, leading to rectal dilation and decreased gastric emptying. This can present as nausea, vomiting, abdominal distention, loss of appetite and pain. Children may also have stool retentive behaviors and aversion to using the toilet as bowel movements are painful. Chronic constipation in children has been associated with urinary stasis and urinary tract infections.

== Causes ==
While it is difficult to assess an exact age at which constipation most commonly arises, children frequently experience constipation in conjunction with life-changes. Examples include: toilet training, starting or transferring to a new school, and changes in diet. Especially in infants, changes in formula or transitioning from breast milk to formula can cause constipation. 95% of cases of constipation in children are thought to be functional constipation (without a structural or biochemical cause). Treatment of these functional causes can be focused on simply relieving the symptoms.

Studies have shown a link between diets low in dietary fibres and high in processed foods, such as fast food, and childhood constipation. Certain medications such as antacids, anticholinergics and opiates are also known to cause constipation in children.

=== Congenital causes ===
A number of diseases present at birth can result in constipation. They are as a group uncommon with Hirschsprung's disease (HD) being the most common. HD is more common in males than females, affecting 1 out of 5000 babies. In people with HD, specific types of cells called 'neural crest cells' fail to migrate to parts of the colon. This causes the affected portion of the colon to be unable to contract and relax to help push out a bowel movement. The affected portion of the colon remains contracted, making it difficult for stool to pass through. Concern for HD should be raised in a child who has not passed stool during the first 48 hours of life. Milder forms of HD, in which only a small portion of the colon is affected, can present later in childhood as constipation, abdominal pain, and bloating. Similar disorders to HD include anal achalasia and hypoganglionosis. In hypoganglionosis, there is a low number of neural crest cells, so the colon remains contracted. In anal achalasia, the internal anal sphincter remains contracted, making it difficult for stool to pass. However, there is a normal number of neural crest cells present.

There are also congenital structural anomalies that can lead to constipation, including anterior displacement of the anus, imperforate anus, strictures, and small left colon syndrome. Anterior displacement of the anus can be diagnosed on physical exam. The disease causes constipation because the inappropriate positioning of the anus which make it difficult to pass a bowel movement. Imperforate anus is an anus that ends in a blind pouch and does not connect to the rest of the person's intestines. Small left colon syndrome is a rare disease in which the left side of the babies colon has a small diameter, which makes it difficult for stool to pass. A risk factor for small left colon syndrome is having a mother with diabetes.

Some symptoms that may indicate an underlying disease include:

- Bowel movements that contain blood.
- Severe abdominal bloating.
- Peri-anal fistula
- Absent anal wink reflex
- Sacral dimple
- Failure to thrive

== Diagnosis ==
=== Rome IV criteria ===
The Rome IV diagnostic criteria for pediatric functional constipation are divided into two age-based categories. Both categories require symptoms to be present for at least one month prior to diagnosis in the absence of criteria for IBS.

==== Infants and toddlers (up to 4 years of age) – Category G7 ====
Diagnosis requires at least two of the following clinical features for at least 1 month:

Criteria	Description
Defecation frequency	Two or fewer defecations per week
Stool retention	History of excessive stool retention
Painful or hard stools	History of painful or hard bowel movements
Stool size	History of large-diameter stools
Fecal mass	Presence of a large fecal mass in the rectum
Fecal incontinence	At least one episode per week of fecal incontinence after acquisition of toileting skills
Large stools (toilet-trained)	History of large-diameter stools that may obstruct the toilet

==== Children and adolescents (4 to 18 years of age) – Category H3a ====
Diagnosis requires at least two of the following clinical features for at least 1 month in a child with a developmental age of at least 4 years:

Criteria	Description
Defecation frequency	Two or fewer defecations per week in the toilet
Fecal incontinence	At least one episode of fecal incontinence per week
Withholding behavior	History of retentive posturing or excessive willful stool retention
Painful or hard stools	History of painful or hard bowel movements
Fecal mass	Presence of a large fecal mass in the rectum
Large-diameter stools	History of large-diameter stools that may obstruct the toilet

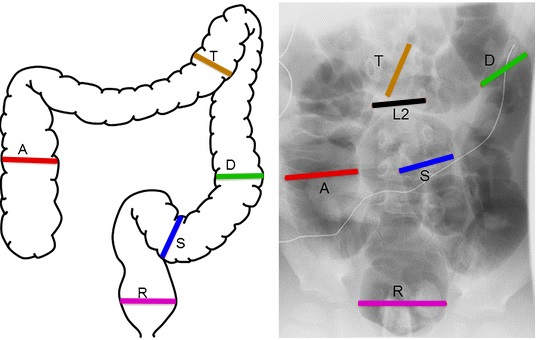
The diameters of different segments of the large intestine can be compared to the width of lumbar vertebra 2 for more consistent reference ranges on abdominal x-rays.

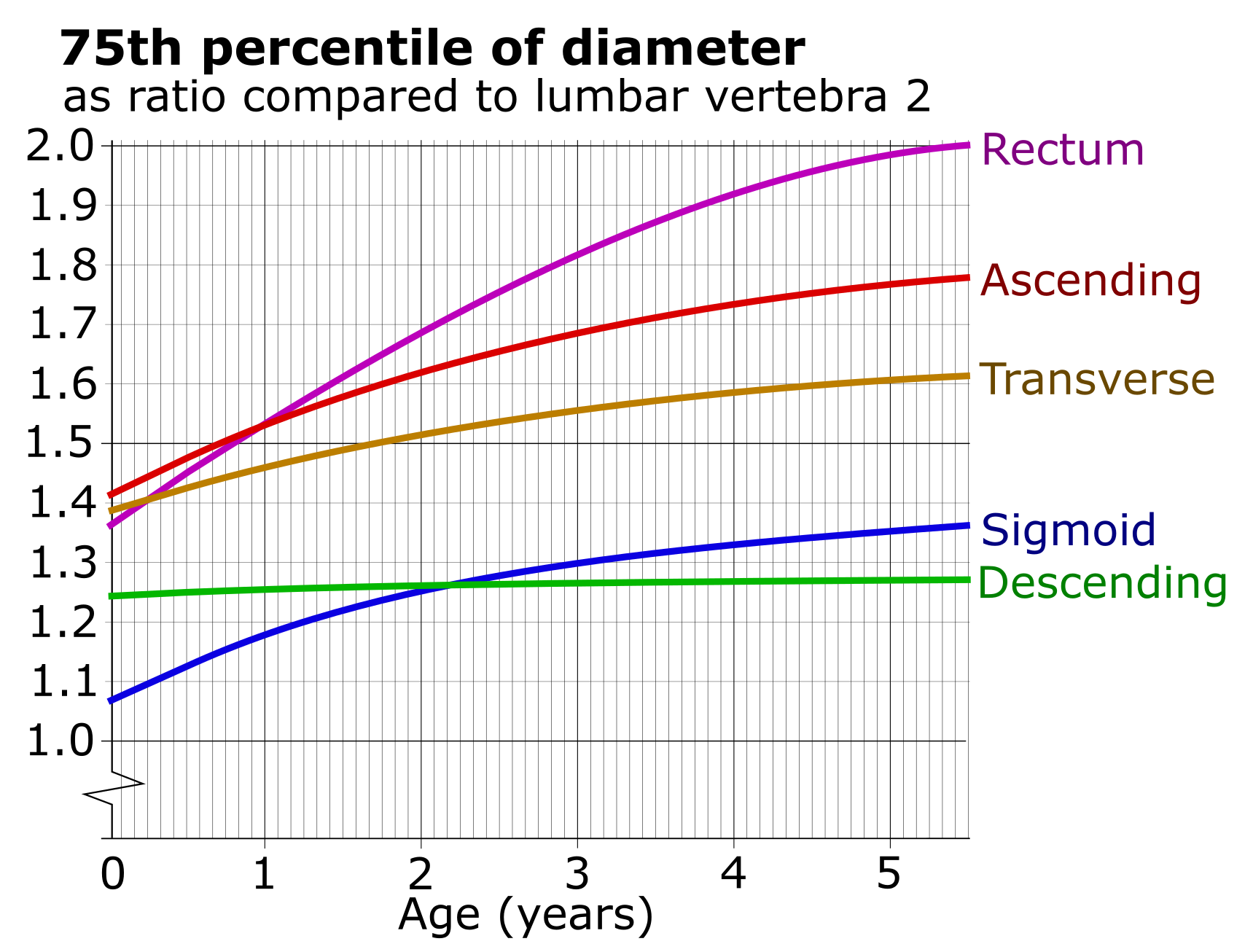
Ratios of large intestinal segments compared to lumbar vertebra 2, as 75th percentile, meaning that 25% of children normally have a ratio higher than this.

For children, the degree of constipation may be scored by the Leech or the Barr systems:

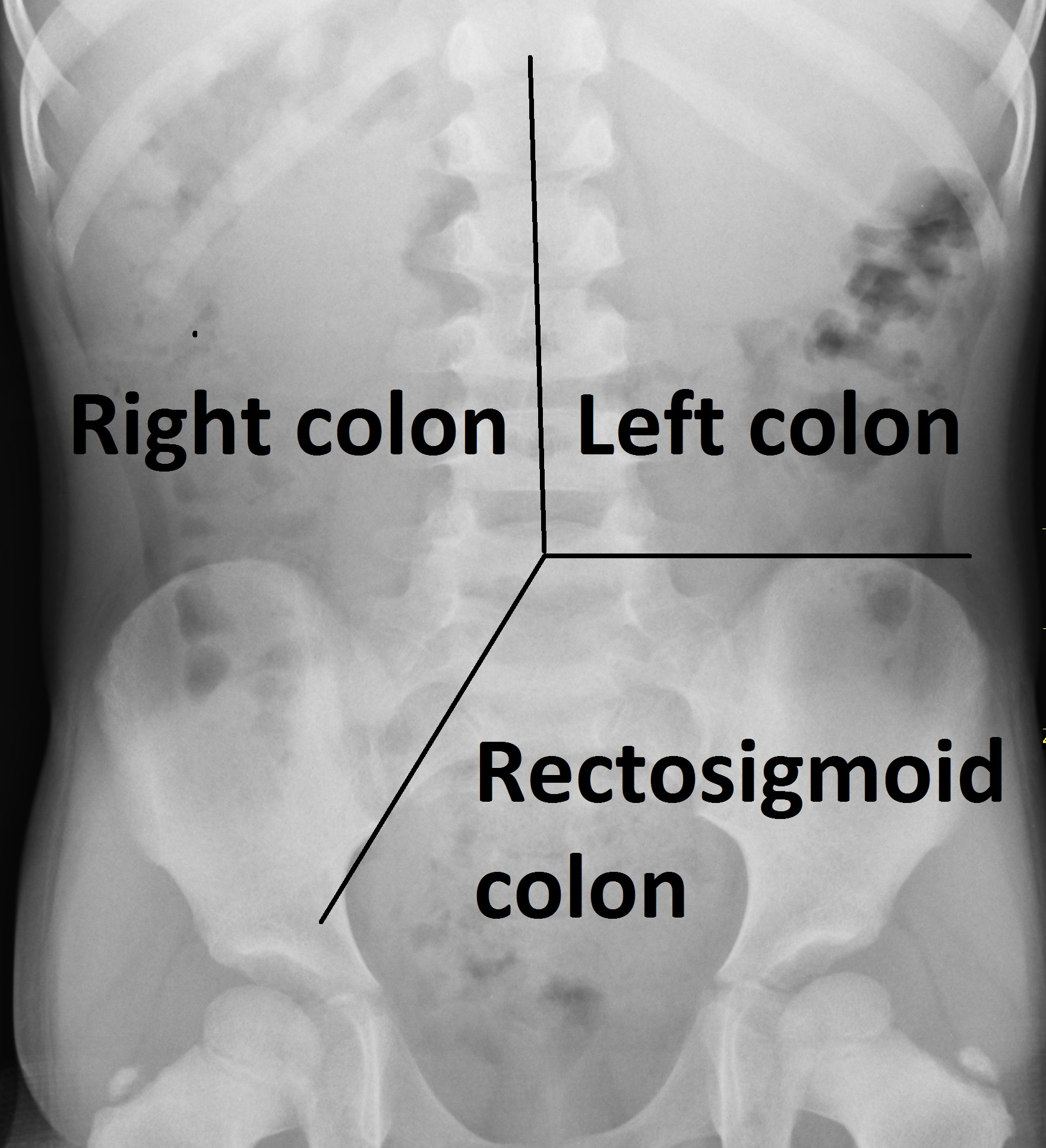
Areas used for the Leech system of constipation grading.

- The Leech system assigns a score of 0 to 5 based on the amount of feces:

- 0: no visible feces
- 1: scanty feces visible
- 2: mild fecal loading
- 3: moderate fecal loading
- 4: severe fecal loading
- 5: severe fecal loading with bowel dilatation
These score are assigned separately for the right colon, the left colon and the rectosigmoid colon, resulting in a maximum score of 15. A Leech score of 9 or greater is regarded as positive for constipation.

- The Barr system rates both the amount and consistency of the faeces, and assigns a score separately for the ascending colon, transverse colon, descending colon and rectum. Its maximum score is 22, and a score of 10 or greater is regarded as positive for constipation.

== Treatment ==
Osmotic laxatives (ex. polyethylene glycol, milk of magnesia, lactulose, etc) are recommended over stimulant laxatives (ex. sennosides, bisacodyl, etc).

Lactulose and milk of magnesia have been compared with polyethylene glycol (PEG) in children. All had similar side effects such as flatulence, watery stools, stomach pain and nausea, but PEG was more effective at treating the symptoms of constipation. Bisacodyl and glycerin suppositories can also be used. After normal bowel movements have been restored, PEG can be continued daily as a maintenance treatment to maintain normal bowel habits. The length of PEG maintenance therapy is not well established, with some advocating continuing PEG for at least 1 months after normal bowel movements have been restored, or until the child is toilet trained. Lactulose and stimulant laxatives are considered second line in the maintenance treatment of constipation. Relapses of constipation symptoms are common.

An increased intake in fibre or fibre supplements have been shown to improve the symptoms of constipation in comparison to placebo; however, the evidence is limited. Fibre helps improve the symptoms of constipation through the action of soluble and insoluble fibres. Soluble fibres facilitate the production of a gel-like substance. This increases stool size, and improves compactness, making it easier to remove the stools from the body. Insoluble fibres also increase the size of the stool, and triggers the gastrointestinal tract to contract, facilitating further movement of gastro-intestinal contents. Sorbitol based juices (such as apple, prune or pear juices) can help in infants or children with constipation as they increase stool water content and frequency.

A structured toileting schedule (such as using the toilet after meals) or a reward system may help with chronic constipation. Consultation to a child psychiatrist may be considered if treatments do not restore normal bowel function within 6 months.

More evidence is needed to evaluate other non-pharmacological interventions. Probiotics are thought to provide healthy bacteria that can aid in stimulating contractions in the gastrointestinal tract to help gastrointestinal contents move forward in the body. Probiotics, increased hydration, and dry cupping were found to be ineffective in the treatment of childhood constipation; however, better studies on these subjects need to be done.

== Epidemiology ==
There is wide variation in the rates of constipation as reported by research in various countries. The variation in research data makes it challenging to describe the true global situation.

Approximately 3% of children have constipation, with girls and boys being equally affected. With constipation accounting for approximately 5% of general pediatrician visits and 25% of pediatric gastroenterologist visits, the symptom carries a significant financial impact upon our healthcare system.

== Society and culture ==
Constipation is often emotionally stressful for children and their caregivers. It is common for parents to bring their children to doctors for this condition. The experience of going to a doctor for this can be stressful.

Too often, children at doctors receive unnecessary health care when they get medical imaging for constipation. Children should only get tests when there is an indication.
