= Desmosis =

Medical condition

Intestinal desmosis is a medical condition implicated in gut motility disorder and chronic constipation. Desmosis can be observed as the absence of the tendinous plexus layer and connective tissue fibers.

== History ==
The absence of the tendinous plexus layer was first described in 1998 by Meier-Ruge.

== Symptoms ==
Desmosis is implicated in disturbed gut motility. Normal peristalsis depends upon the interaction between muscles, nerve cells and tendinous connective tissue. A malfunction of any of these leads to intestinal motility disorders. Patients with desmosis demonstrate chronic constipation.

== Forms ==
Desmosis may be congenital (aplastic form) or acquired (atrophic form).

=== Congenital desmosis ===
The aplastic form is rare. Typical clinical findings are hypoperistalsis, and pseudo-obstruction. These are found in premature infants, associated with low birth weight.

=== Acquired desmosis ===
The atrophic form is more frequent. Inflammation of the muscularis propria releases enzymes including collagenases which destroy the connective tissue of the bowel wall. Primarily newborns and small children are affected, although this manifestation can also be found in adults. The most common location is the colon with a necrotizing enterocolitis as well as Crohn Disease and diverticulitis. If the taenia are also affected, the disease is defined as complete atrophic desmosis, all other forms without involvement of the taenia are referred to as incomplete. Clinically, patients demonstrate chronic constipation.

== Diagnosis ==
As proposed by Giuseppe Martucciello, microscopic diagnosis requires laparoscopic intestinal full-thickness biopsies from colon. Histological findings are absence of the tendinous plexus layer and connective tissue fibers in longitudinal and circular muscle layer.
