= Retroperistalsis =

- Specialty: Gastroenterology

Retroperistalsis is the reverse of the involuntary smooth muscle contractions of peristalsis. It usually occurs as a precursor to vomiting. Local irritation of the stomach, such as bacteria or food poisoning, activates the emetic center of the brain which in turn signals an imminent vomiting reflex. Retroperistalsis begins in the small intestine and pyloric sphincter. Food then moves in the opposite direction, often from the duodenum into the stomach.

Retroperistalsis occurs pathologically during vomiting and physiologically at the first part of the duodenum where it protects from high acidity of food, and also at the terminal ileum, where an amount of water and electrolytes are absorbed to assist defecation.

== See also ==
- Vomiting
