= Retching =

Reverse movement of the stomach and esophagus without vomiting

- Specialty: Gastroenterology

Retching (also known as dry heaving) is the reverse movement (retroperistalsis) of the stomach and esophagus without vomiting. It can be caused by bad smells or choking, or by withdrawal from certain medications, or after vomiting has completed. Retching can also occur as a result of an emotional response or from stress, which produces the same physical reaction. The function is thought to be mixing gastric contents with intestinal refluxate in order to buffer the former and give it momentum in preparation of vomiting. Treatments include medication and correction of the fluid and electrolyte balance.

== Physiology ==
The retching phase is characterized by a series of violent spasmodic abdomino-thoracic contractions with the glottis closed. During this time, the inspiratory (inhalatory) movements of the chest wall and diaphragm are opposed by the expiratory contractions of the abdominal musculature. At the same time, movements of the stomach and its contents take place. Whereas a patient will complain of disagreeable sensations during nausea, speech is not possible during retching. The characteristic movements furnish a ready diagnostic sign of the retching phase. Schindler (1937) studied retching on two occasions during gastroscopy and noted that longitudinal folds appeared in the previously smooth antrum, thickened quickly, came together and completely closed the antrum. Retching involves a deep inspiration against a closed glottis. This, along with contraction of the abdomen, leads to a pressure difference between the abdominal and thoracic cavities. As a result, the stomach and gastric contents are displaced upwards toward the thoracic cavity.

Retching comprises a rhythmically alternating (about once per second) elevation and descension of the entire pharyngolaryngo-esophago-gastric apparatus in synchrony with the movement of the diaphragm. The function of retching may be to mix gastric contents with intestinal refluxate to buffer gastric contents before gastroesophageal reflux and to impart a momentum to the gastric contents before vomiting. Airway protection during retching is accomplished by glottal closure during retches and constriction of the upper esophageal sphincter between retches.

== Versus vomiting ==
Vomiting (the expulsion of gastric contents) is usually preceded by retching, but retching and vomiting can occur separately and involve different sets of muscles. During a retch, thoracic pressure is decreased and abdominal pressure is increased, which may serve to position gastric contents and overcome esophageal resistance. Conversely, a vomit occurs with increased thoracic and abdominal pressure. Retches and vomits are commonly lumped together in behavioral analyses and consequently the neural controls for these processes are not well delineated.

== Treatments ==
The treatments for significant retching include correction of fluid and electrolyte balance, nutritional support and medications like phenothiazines (such as Compazine and Phenergan), 5-HT3 antagonist (such as Zofran), dopamine receptor antagonists (such as Reglan), antihistamines (Antivert, Dramamine, Benadryl) and anticholinergics (scopolamine). Alternative approaches are also available. The best-studied alternative therapy is perhaps the use of acupressure for pregnancy-related nausea and vomiting. Wristbands with acupressure buttons are commercially available. An implanted device with attached electrodes into the gastric wall can be an option for patients with refractory nausea and vomiting.

== See also ==
- Pharyngeal reflex, the gag reflex
- Regurgitation (digestion)
