= Corkscrew esophagus =

Radiographic sign of esophageal dysmotility

Corkscrew esophagus is a radiographic sign seen on a barium swallow in which the esophagus takes on a twisted, helical outline resembling a corkscrew. It is produced by strong, uncoordinated, non-peristaltic contractions of the esophageal wall that compartmentalize the barium column and give the lumen a curled or beaded shape. When the contractions create a row of bead-like outpouchings, the same appearance is often called rosary bead esophagus. The sign is classically linked to distal esophageal spasm, historically termed diffuse esophageal spasm, but it is not specific to any single condition.

== Causes ==
The corkscrew pattern reflects abnormal esophageal motility rather than a fixed structural lesion. Distal esophageal spasm is the disorder most often cited, and in the Chicago Classification this diagnosis is defined by premature contractions, measured as a distal latency under 4.5 seconds, in at least 20% of swallows together with normal relaxation of the lower esophageal sphincter. A similar radiographic appearance has been reported in achalasia, including the spastic (type III) subtype, and in hypercontractile (jackhammer) esophagus. Gastroesophageal reflux disease and achalasia are usually considered in the differential when the finding is seen.

== Diagnosis ==
On barium fluoroscopy the esophageal body loses its normal smooth peristaltic stripping and instead shows multiple simultaneous indentations that twist the lumen into a helix. Upper endoscopy may show concentric or circular folds in the distal esophagus that mirror the fluoroscopic picture. The sign is neither sensitive nor specific. In a cohort of 108 patients with distal esophageal spasm at a single centre, most abnormal esophagograms showed only nonspecific changes, and the classic corkscrew appearance was present in just three patients. For this reason high-resolution manometry, not radiography, is used to establish the underlying motility diagnosis.
