= Protobird =

Dinosaurs possessing bird features

"Protobird" is an informal term that has been used by some paleontologists when discussing animals that, while technically classified as non-avian dinosaurs, possess many features normally associated with birds. All protobirds are extinct.

Zhou and Farlow (2001), for example, used the term "protobird" for primitive members of the clade Avialae. In this sense, protobirds would include animals like Confuciusornis, Sapeornis, and the Enantiornithes. These animals were small, flying, feathered, and closely related to birds. The authors restricted the term "bird" to refer only to Aves, which they used to mean only modern ("crown group") birds.

Gregory S. Paul used the term "protobird" in a wider sense in 1988, to refer to the extremely bird-like non-avian dinosaurs (Maniraptora), including oviraptorosaurs, troodontids, and dromaeosaurids. Paul speculated that these forms were so bird-like they probably had feathers, an idea later proven by fossil evidence.

== See also ==
- Feathered dinosaurs
