= Pharyngeal reflex =

Reflex at the back of the throat

The pharyngeal reflex or gag reflex is a reflex muscular contraction of the back of the throat, evoked by touching the roof of the mouth, back of the tongue, area around the tonsils, uvula, and back of the throat. It, along with other aerodigestive reflexes such as reflexive pharyngeal swallowing, prevents objects in the oral cavity from entering the throat except as part of normal swallowing and helps prevent choking, and is a form of coughing. The pharyngeal reflex is different from the laryngeal spasm, which is a reflex muscular contraction of the vocal cords.

== Reflex arc ==
In a reflex arc, a series of physiological steps occur very rapidly to produce a reflex. Generally, a sensory receptor receives an environmental stimulus, in this case from objects reaching nerves in the back of the throat, and sends a message via an afferent nerve to the central nervous system (CNS). The CNS receives this message and sends an appropriate response via an efferent nerve (also known as a motor neuron) to effector cells located in the same initial area that can then carry out the appropriate response.

In the case of the pharyngeal reflex:

- the sensory limb is mediated predominantly by CN IX (glossopharyngeal nerve)
- the motor limb by CN X (vagus nerve).

The gag reflex involves a brisk and brief elevation of the soft palate and bilateral contraction of pharyngeal muscles evoked by touching the posterior pharyngeal wall. Touching the soft palate can lead to a similar reflex response. However, in that case, the sensory limb of the reflex is the CN V (trigeminal nerve). In very sensitive individuals, much more of the brain stem may be involved; a simple gag may enlarge to retching and vomiting in some.

== Suppression and activation ==
Swallowing unusually large objects or placing objects in the back of the mouth may cause the pharyngeal reflex. Some people, for instance sword swallowers, have learned how to suppress it. In contrast, triggering the reflex is sometimes done intentionally to induce vomiting, such as by those who have bulimia nervosa.

According to one study, one in three people lack a gag reflex. However, on the other end of the spectrum are people with a hypersensitive gag reflex. This hypersensitivity can lead to issues in various situations, such as swallowing a pill or large bites of food, or visiting the dentist. Hypersensitivity is generally a conditioned response, usually occurring following a previous experience. There are a variety of ways to desensitize one's hypersensitivity, from relaxation to numbing the mouth and throat to training one's soft palate to get used to being touched.

Anti-nausea medicines, sedatives, local and general anaesthetics, herbal remedies, behavioural therapies, acupressure, acupuncture, laser, and prosthetic devices can be used to manage exaggerated gag reflex during dental treatment. Studies showed with very low‐certainty evidence that acupuncture and laser at the P6 point (located in the wrist) reduced gagging without sedation. However, there was no difference when practiced with sedation. Therefore, more research needs to be carried out regarding these interventions.

Some people seem to be able to completely stop their gag reflex for a short time by pressing certain pressure points, even without prior training.

== Absence ==
In certain cases, absence of the gag reflex and pharyngeal sensation can be a symptom of a number of severe medical conditions, such as damage to the glossopharyngeal nerve, the vagus nerve, or brain death.

In unilateral (one-sided) glossopharyngeal nerve (CN IX - sensory component) damage, there will be no gag response when touching the pharyngeal wall on the same side of the damaged nerve. With one-sided vagal nerve (CN X - motor component) damage, the soft palate will elevate and pull toward the intact side regardless of the side of the pharynx that is touched. This is because the sensory component is intact on both sides, but only the motor nerves supplying one side of the soft palatine and pharyngeal muscles is working, therefore the contraction of the muscles in the reflex is asymmetrical. If both CN IX and X are damaged on one side (not uncommon), stimulation of the normal side elicits only a unilateral response, with deviation of the soft palate to that side; no consensual response is seen. Touching the damaged side produces no response at all.

At one point, it was thought that a lack of the gag reflex in stroke patients was a good predictor for dysphagia (difficulty with swallowing) or laryngeal aspiration (food or drink entering the larynx), and was therefore commonly checked for. However, in one study, 37% of healthy people did not have a gag reflex, yet all subjects except for one still retained an intact pharyngeal sensation. These results suggest that the muscles that control the gag reflex remain independent of those that control normal swallowing. Since this reflex is commonly not found in healthy people, its predictive value in determining the risk for swallowing disorders is severely limited. Pharyngeal sensation, on the other hand, as seen by this study, is rarely absent, and could prove better at predicting future problems with swallowing.

== Reflexive pharyngeal swallow ==
Closely related to the gag reflex, in which food or other foreign substances are forced back out of the pharynx, swallowing generally pushes food through the digestive system into the stomach. This reflex in particular functions as a protective system for the upper respiratory tract as it not only forces the glottis to close, thereby preventing any substances getting into the airways, but also clears the pharynx of any residual substances by a swallow.

This particular reflex is simply one of several aerodigestive reflexes, including also the pharyngoglottal closure reflex (in which no swallowing occurs, yet the glottis still closes) and the pharyngo-upper esophageal sphincter contractile reflex, which occurs mainly during gastroesophageal reflux episodes. All either forcibly close the glottis or allow the pharynx to remove particles into the digestive tract that may have been forced back up by both this tract and the upper respiratory tract. These reflexes can also protect the airways from any food or liquids that may spill over from the hypopharynx. The hypopharynx is the bottom part of the pharynx, and can be considered the first area where the digestive tract splits from the airways. However, if the maximum capacity of fluids that the hypopharynx can safely hold is exceeded, then this excess fluid spills into the larynx and from there into the lungs. Therefore, these reflexes prevent levels reaching this maximum volume.

Since both the digestive system and the respiratory system are connected by the pharynx, there are many problems and diseases that occur when the body is unable to regulate passage of food and air into the appropriate tracts. Perhaps the most preventable cause of damage to these reflexes originates from smoking. One study has shown that, when compared to non-smokers, the threshold volumes (the lowest volume at which one of these reflexes is triggered) for both the pharyngo-upper esophageal sphincter contractile reflex and reflexive pharyngeal swallowing is increased.

== See also ==
- Retching, also known as dry heaving
