= Telocyte =

Interstitial cells

Telocytes are a type of interstitial (stromal) cells with very long (tens to hundreds of micrometres) and very thin prolongations (mostly below the resolving power of light microscopy) called telopodes.

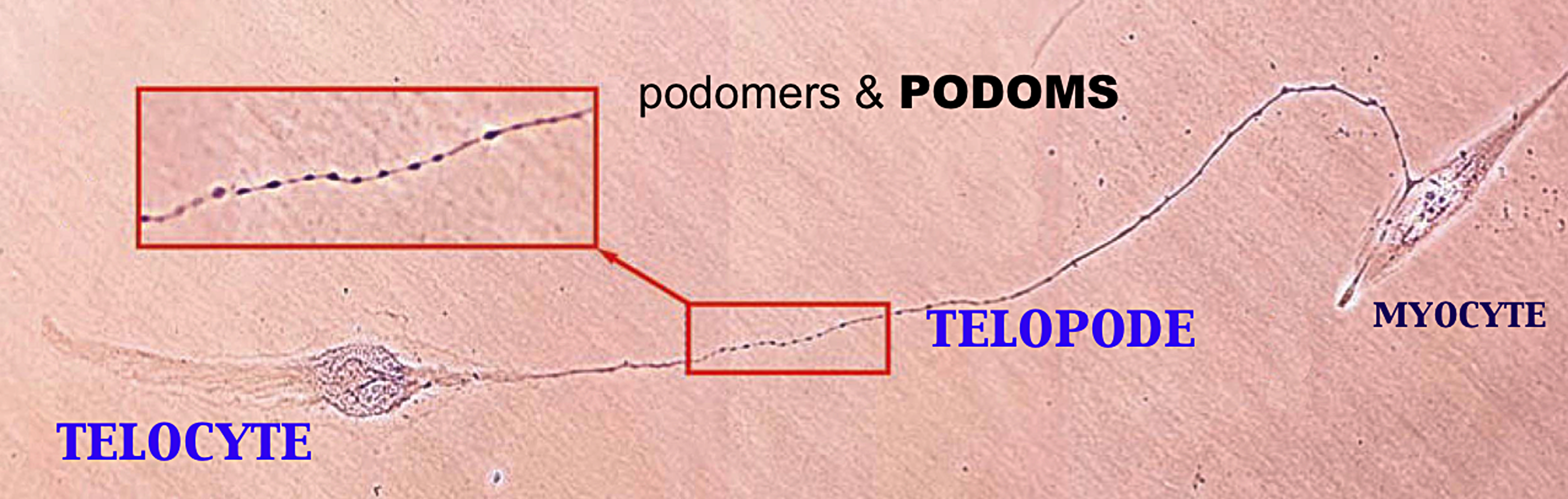
Figure 1. Human non-pregnant myometrium in cell culture; day 3; the first passage. Giemsa staining. One TC establishing contacts with a myocyte by a Tp of about 65 mm long. Photographic composition of 4 serial phase contrast images; original magnification 40x. In red rectangles, a higher magnification clearly shows the moniliform aspect; at least 40 specific dilations (podoms) interconnected by thin segments (podomeres) are visible in a ‘beadlike’ fashion.

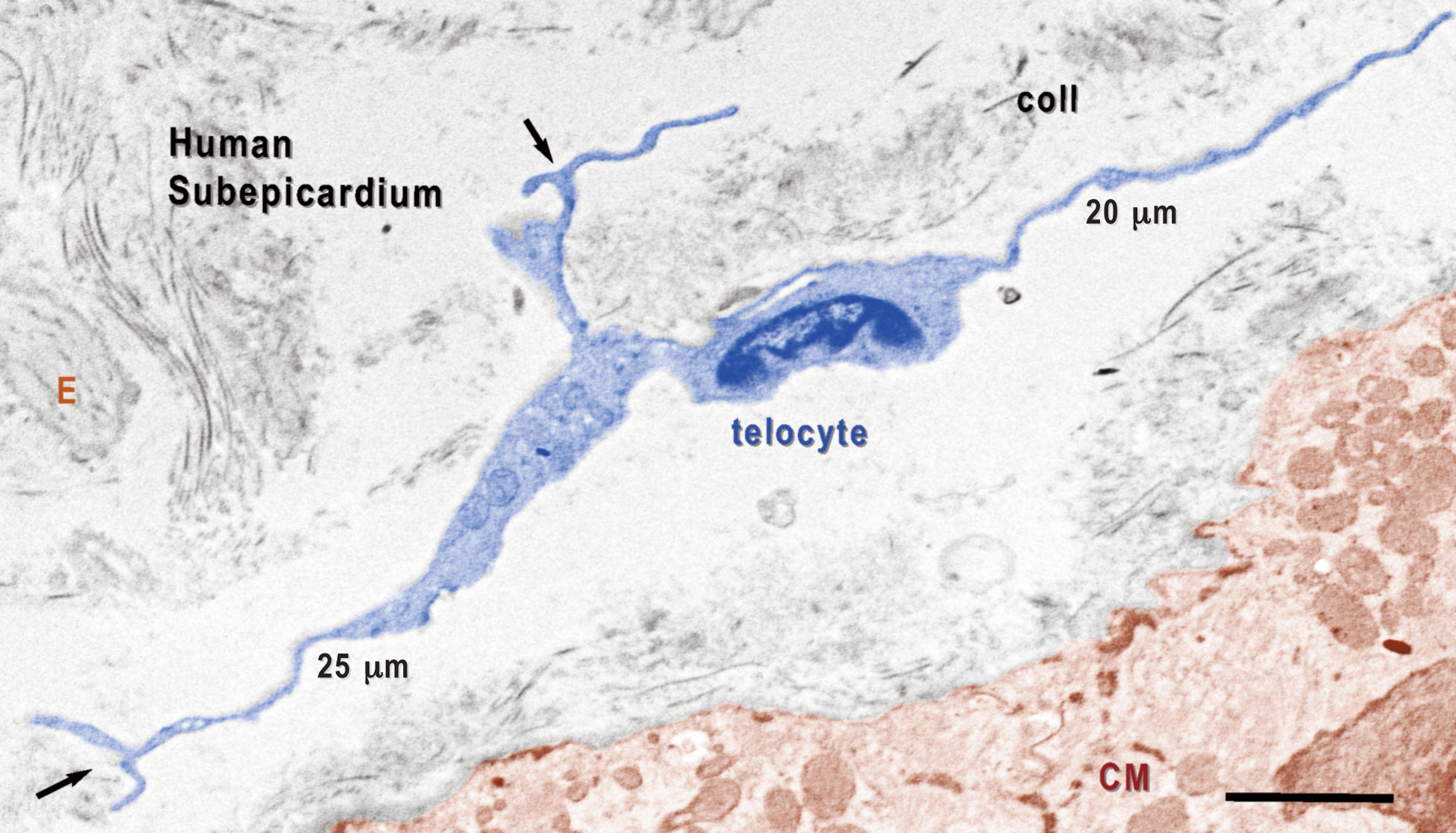
Figure 2. Digitally coloured TEM image shows TC (blue) in human subepicardium, bordering the peripheral cardiomyocytes (CM, highlighted in brown). The TC has three telopodes, illustrating: a) the distinctive dichotomous pattern of branching (arrows); b) Tp are very thin at the emergence of the cell body; c) alternating podoms and podomeres. Note that some portions of podomeres have the same thickness as collagen fibrills, which make them impossible to be observed under light microscopy. E - elastin Scale bar - 2 mm.

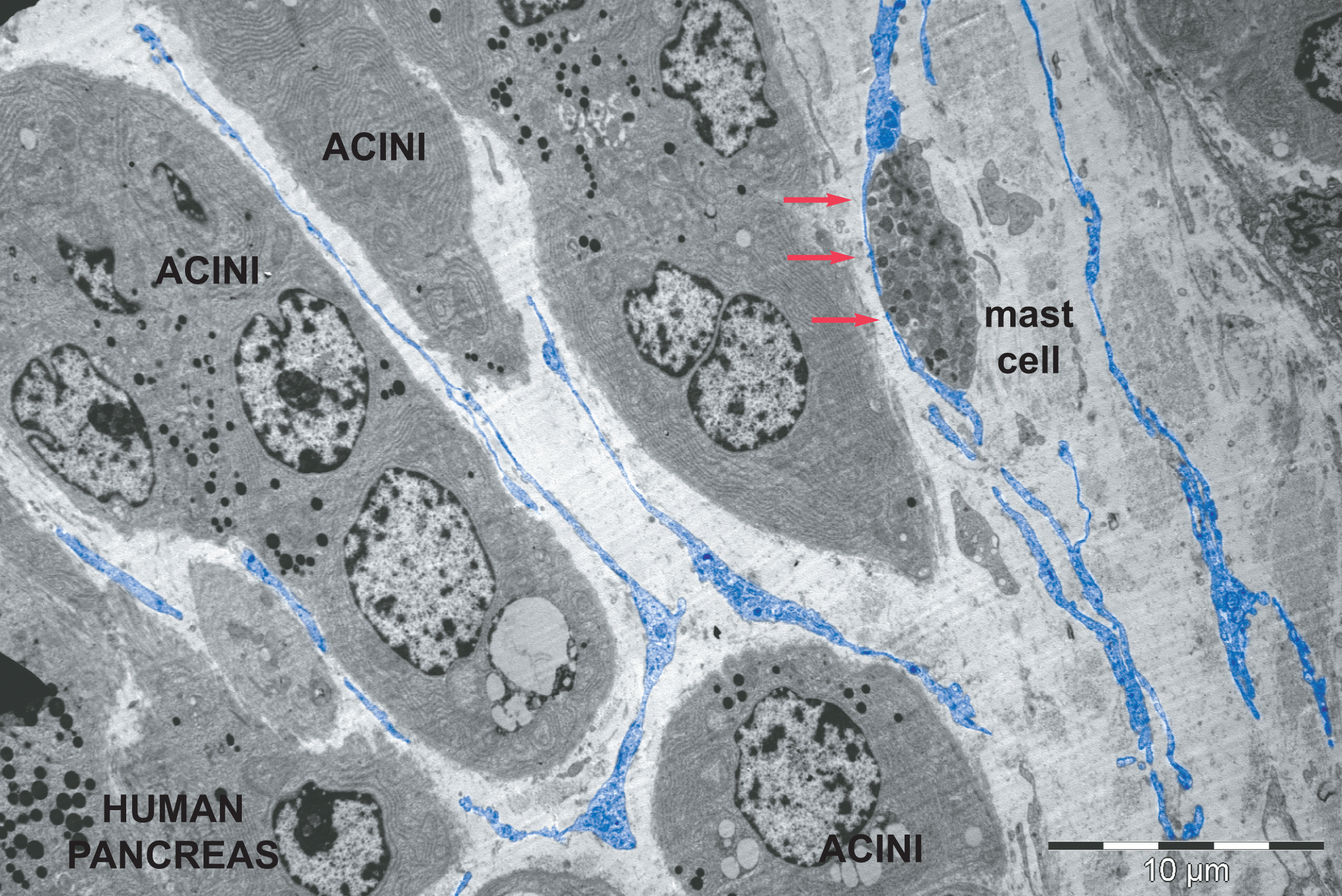
Figure 3. Human exocrine pancreas. TC (blue) form with their typical Tp a network around acini. Note the stromal synapse (red arrows) between a mast cell and the Tp of a TC. Courtesy of Dr. M.I. Nicolescu, Department of Cellular and Molecular Medicine, ‘Carol Davila’ University of Medicine and Pharmacy, Bucharest, Romania.

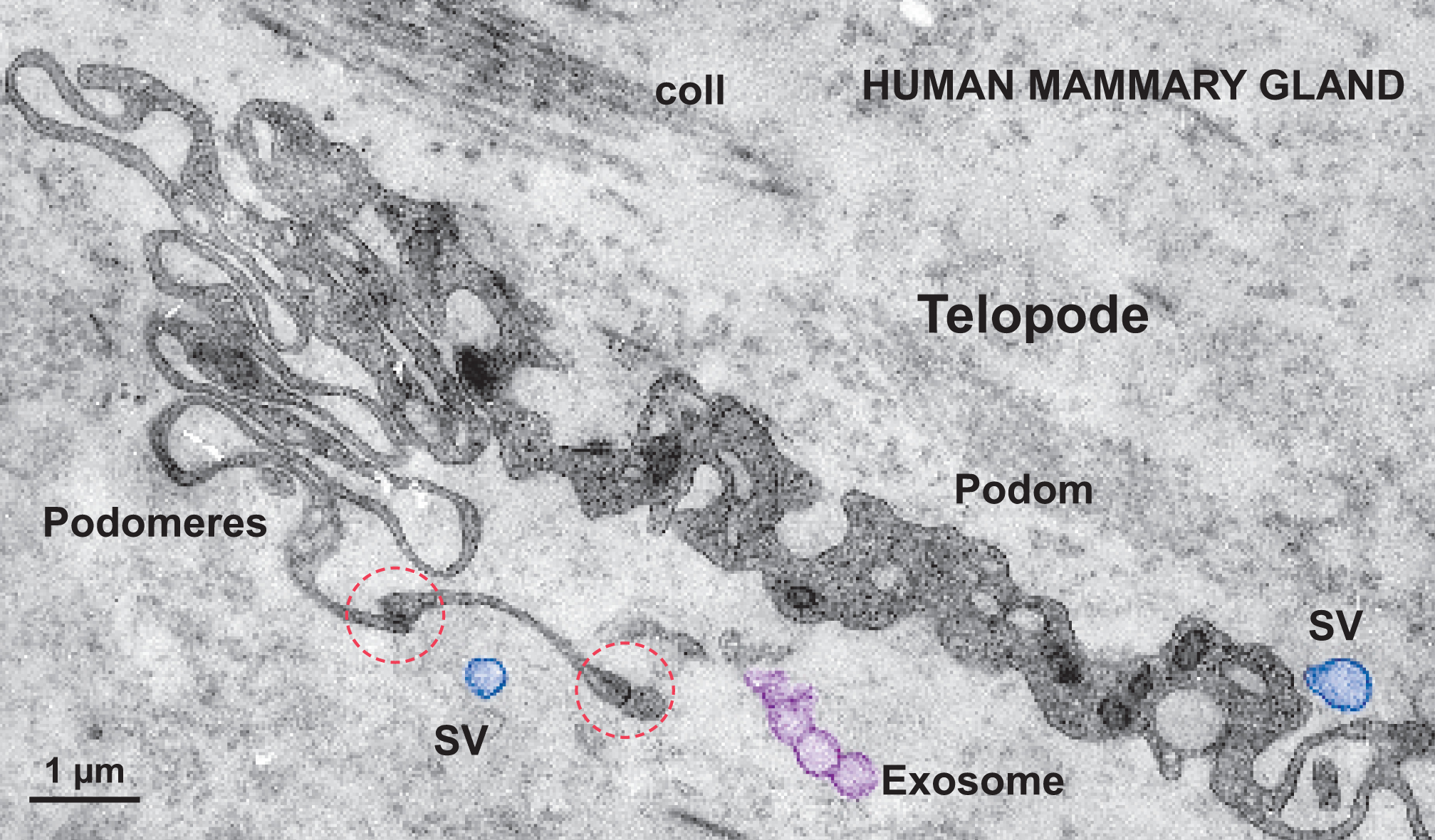
Figure 4. Human resting mammary gland stroma. One TC hallmark, namely Tp, appears very long and convoluted. Note homocellular junctions marked by red circles, as well as shed vesicles (blue) and an exosome (violet).

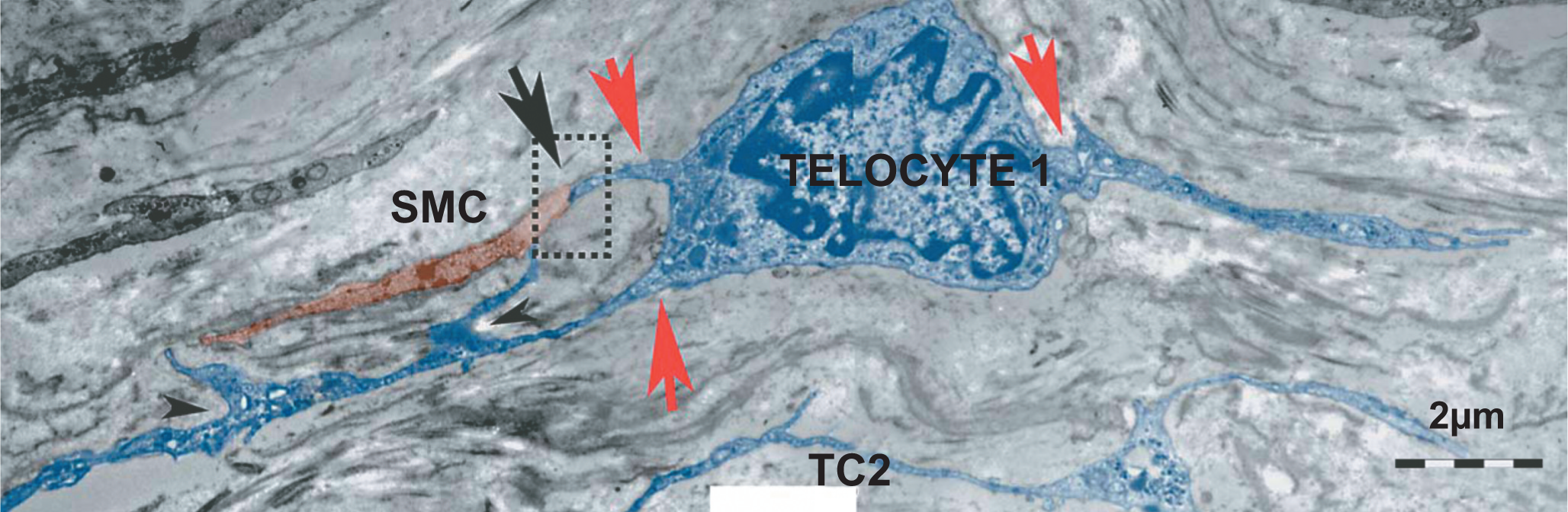
Figure 5. Human term placenta. The TC (blue) has few organelles in the perinuclear area and 3 emerging Tp (red arrows); black arrowheads mark the dichotomic branching points. Note the podoms and podomeres. Black arrow points the junction between a Tp and a smooth muscle cell (SMC, colored in brown). Reproduced with permission from [2].

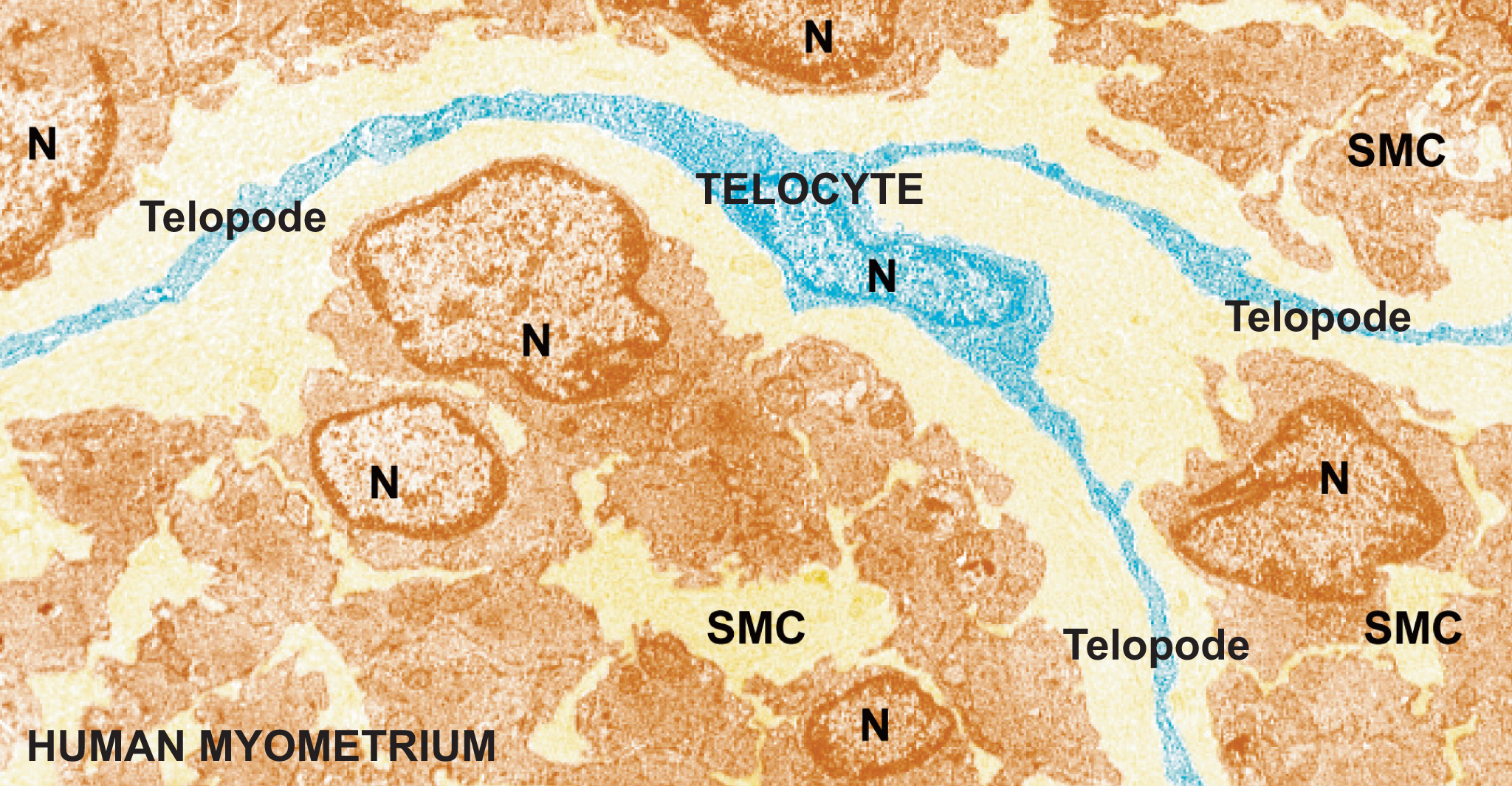
Figure 6. Non-pregnant myometrium. Digitally colored TC (blue) with 3 Tp that encircle bundles of cross-cut smooth muscle cells (SMC, Sienna brown); N - nuclei. Reproduced with permission from [1].

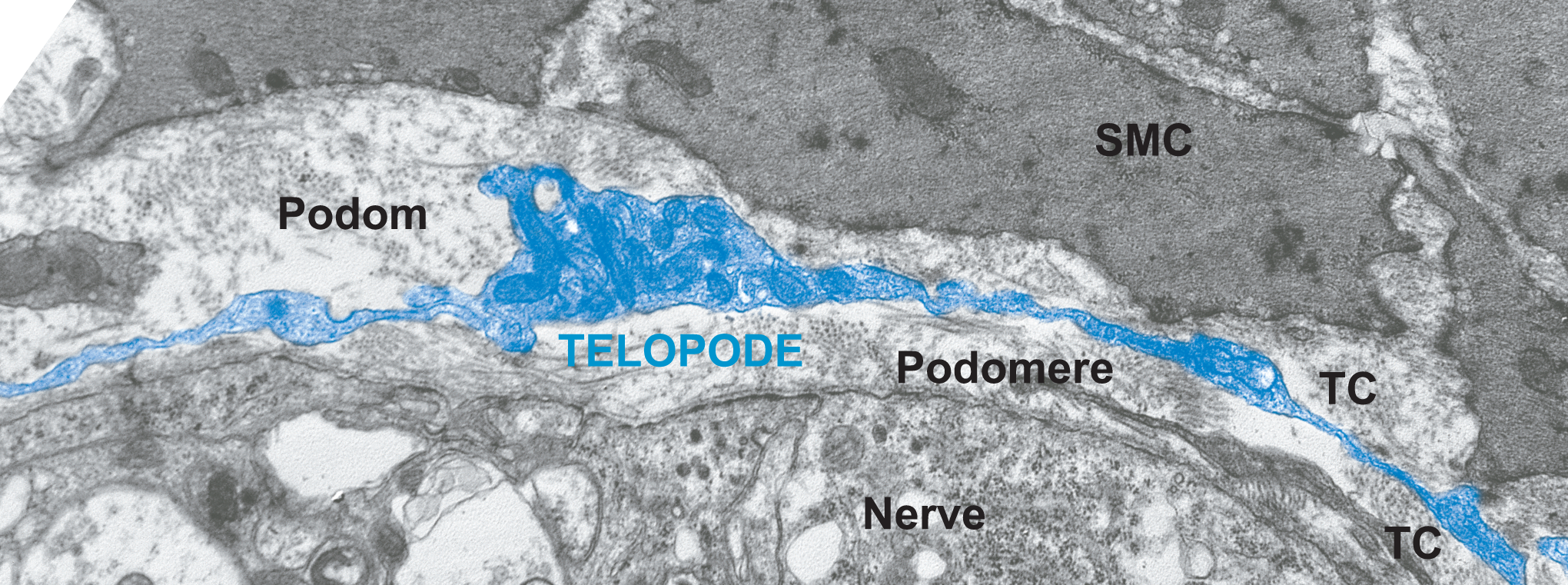
Figure 7. Rat jejunum. A typical Tp (blue) located between smooth muscle cells (SMC) and nerve endings. Note a large podom and the corresponding podomeres. TC body is not captured in the image. Courtesy of Dr. D. Cretoiu, Department of Cellular and Molecular Medicine, ‘Carol Davila’ University of Medicine and Pharmacy, Bucharest, Romania.

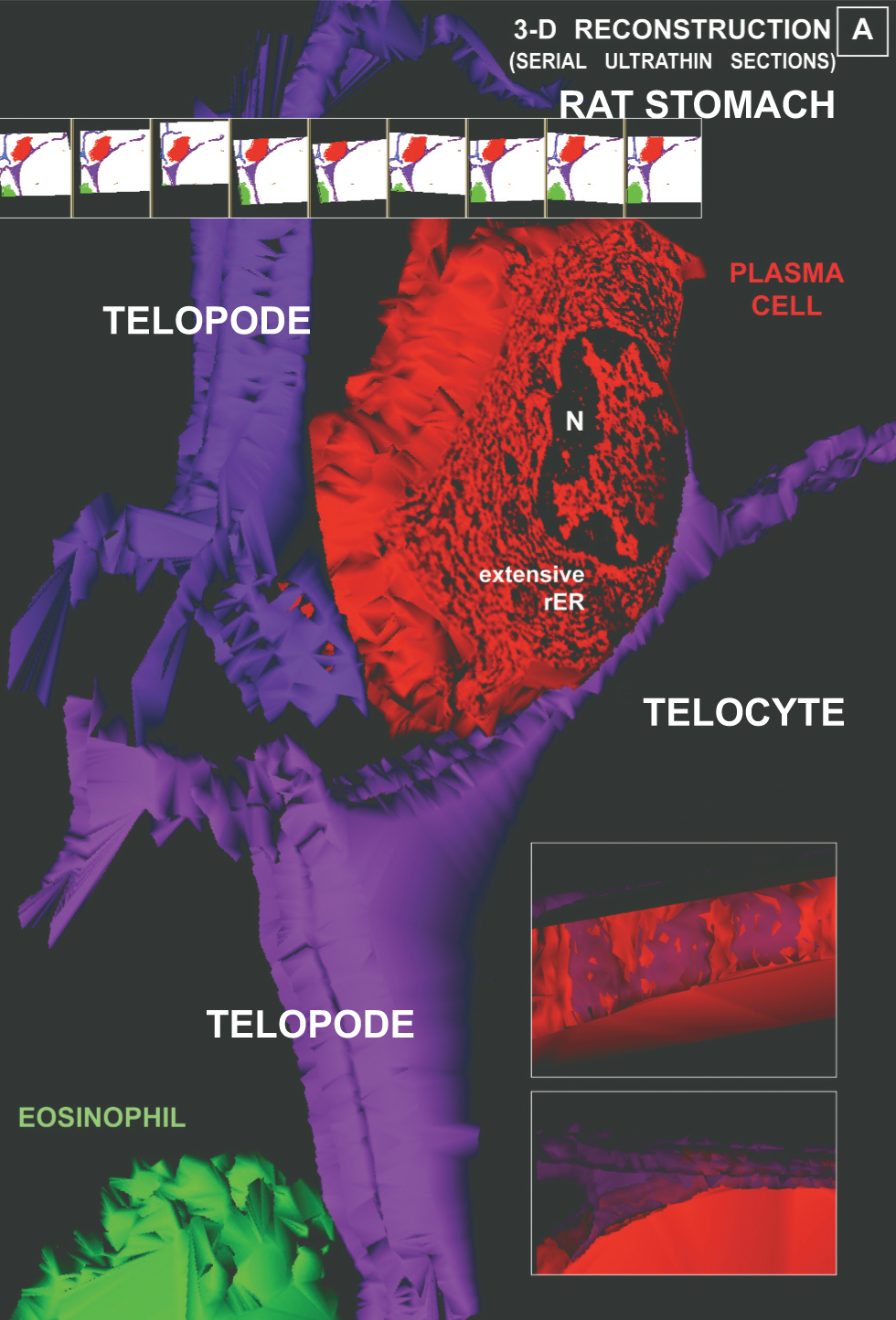
Figure 8. Rat stomach, multicontact stromal synapses between two TC, a plasma cell and an eosinophil, respectively. 3D image computer-aided reconstruction from 9 serial ultrathin sections; original magnification 1,500x. The upper inset shows contact points where the distance between both cell membranes (Tp membrane and plasma-cell membrane) is 15 nm or less (in violet), seen from the plasma cell cytoplasm. In the lower inset Tp were rendered transparent in order to depict the same synapse. Reproduced with permission from [22].

== Rationale for the term telocyte ==
Professor Laurențiu M. Popescu's group from Bucharest, Romania described a new type of cell. Popescu coined the terms telocytes (TC) for these cells, and telopodes (Tp) for their extremely long but thin prolongations in order to prevent further confusion with other interstitial (stromal) cells (e.g., fibroblast (FB), fibroblast-like cells, myofibroblast, mesenchymal cells). Telopodes present an alternation of thin segments, podomeres (with caliber mostly under 200 nm, below the resolving power of light microscopy) and dilated segments, podoms, which accommodate mitochondria, (rough) endoplasmic reticulum and caveolae - the so-called "Ca^{2+} uptake/release units". The concept of TC was promptly adopted by other laboratories, as well.

== Telocytes and/or fibroblasts? ==
The interstitium (stroma) is in most of the cases seen as a connecting "device" for the specific structures of an organ. Usually, people perceive interstitial cells as being mainly (or even, only) fibroblasts. However, fibroblasts have the function of generating connective tissue matrix, specifically, collagen. The distinction between TC and fibroblasts is obvious since they have different ultrastructure and phenotype. Therefore, their functions should be mostly different: TC - intercellular signaling (connections), but fibroblasts - collagen synthesis. In other words, TC are "more" functionally oriented while fibroblasts are "more" structurally oriented, responsible for fibrosis.

There are some clear ultrastructural features that differentiate telocytes from fibroblasts. For instance, the general aspect of TC is of a small oval (piriform/spindle/triangular/stellate)-shaped cellular body, containing a nucleus surrounded by a small amount of cytoplasm. Anyway, the shape of the cell body depends on the number of Tp. TC cellular body average dimensions are, as measured on EM images, 9.3 μm ± 3.2 μm (min. 6.3 μm; max. 16.4 μm). Fibroblast nucleus is typically euchromatic, but TC nucleus is mostly heterochromatic. Mitochondria represent only 2% of cell body volume and the Golgi complex is small in TC. Fibroblasts Golgi complex is prominent and the rough endoplasmic reticulum is very well developed (usually 5-12%) of cell volume.

Since telopodes are distinctive for telocytes, here are their main features:

1. Number: 1–5 (frequently only 2–3 telopodes are observed on a single section, depending on site and angle of section, since their 3D convolutions prevent them to be observed at their full length in a 2D very thin section);
2. Length: tens – up to hundreds of μm, as measured on EM images (e.g. Figs. 2-10). However, under favorable conditions in cell cultures, their entire length can be captured in several successive images (Fig. 1);
3. Thickness: uneven caliber, mostly below 0.2 μm (below the resolving power of light microscopy), visible under electron microscopy;
4. Moniliform aspect: podoms and podomeres; average caliber of podomeres: 0.1 μm ± 0.05 μm, min. = 0.003 μm; max. = 0.24 μm; Podoms accommodate: mitochondria, (rough) endoplasmic reticulum, caveolae, a trio called ‘Ca^{2+}-uptake/release units’.
5. Branching, with a dichotomous pattern;
6. Organization in a labyrinthine system, forming a 3D network anchored by hetero- and homocellular junctions.

== Summary ==
Here is shown visual evidence (electron microscopy, electron tomography, phase contrast microscopy) for the existence of Telocytes (TC) in many organs from human and rodents. TC and Tp, and also podoms and podomeres were found in:

- cavitary organs:
- heart (endo-, myo-, and pericardium);
- stomach and intestine, with mesentery;
- gall bladder;
- uterus and fallopian tube;
- non-cavitary organs:
- lungs and pleura;
- pancreas (exocrine gland);
- mammary gland;
- placenta;
- kidneys;

Recent evidence shows the involvement of TC in pathology. TC are strategically located in between blood vessels (capillaries), nerve endings and the specific resident cell populations of a given organ. TC establish via Tp homo- and heterocellular junctions and release shed vesicles and exosomes.

== Perspectives: regenerative medicine ==
TC and SC (Stem Cells) make a tandem (due to specific intercellular junctions) within the so-called SC niches, at least in heart and lungs. Hence, TC could be key-players in regenerating and repair of some organs. The tandem TC-SC could be a better option for therapy rather than SC alone. Published studies suggest that cardiac TCs could be regarded as a potential cell source for therapeutic use to improve cardiac repair and function after a myocardial infarction, either alone or in tandem with SC. Recent data show that TCs are completely different from FBs, using a quantitative proteomics approach, suggesting that TCs might play specific roles in mechanical sensing and mechanochemical conversion task, tissue homoeostasis and remodelling/renewal.

== Figures ==
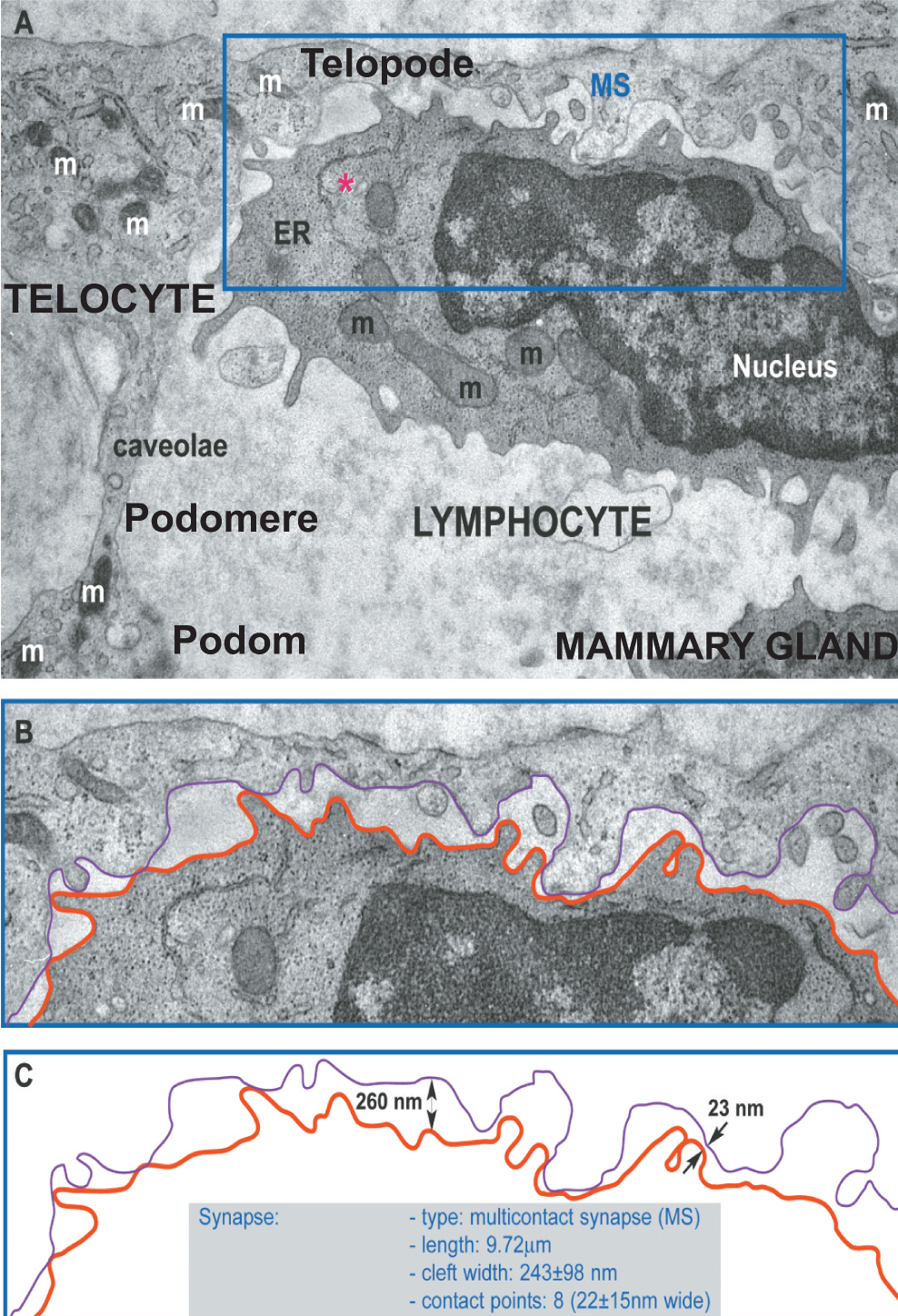
Figure 9. Human mammary gland stroma: TEM; original magnification 9,100x. A: Lymphocyte establishing a multicontact synapse (MS) with a TC. The blue rectangle shows the synaptic ‘kiss and run’ region. The synaptic membranes appear traced in B (violet - TC, orange - lymphocyte). The distances between membranes are shown in C. Note (asterisk) a peculiar conformation of ER connecting mitochondria with the cell surface, suggestive for a possible role in synaptic Ca^{2+} homeostasis. Reproduced with permission from [22]

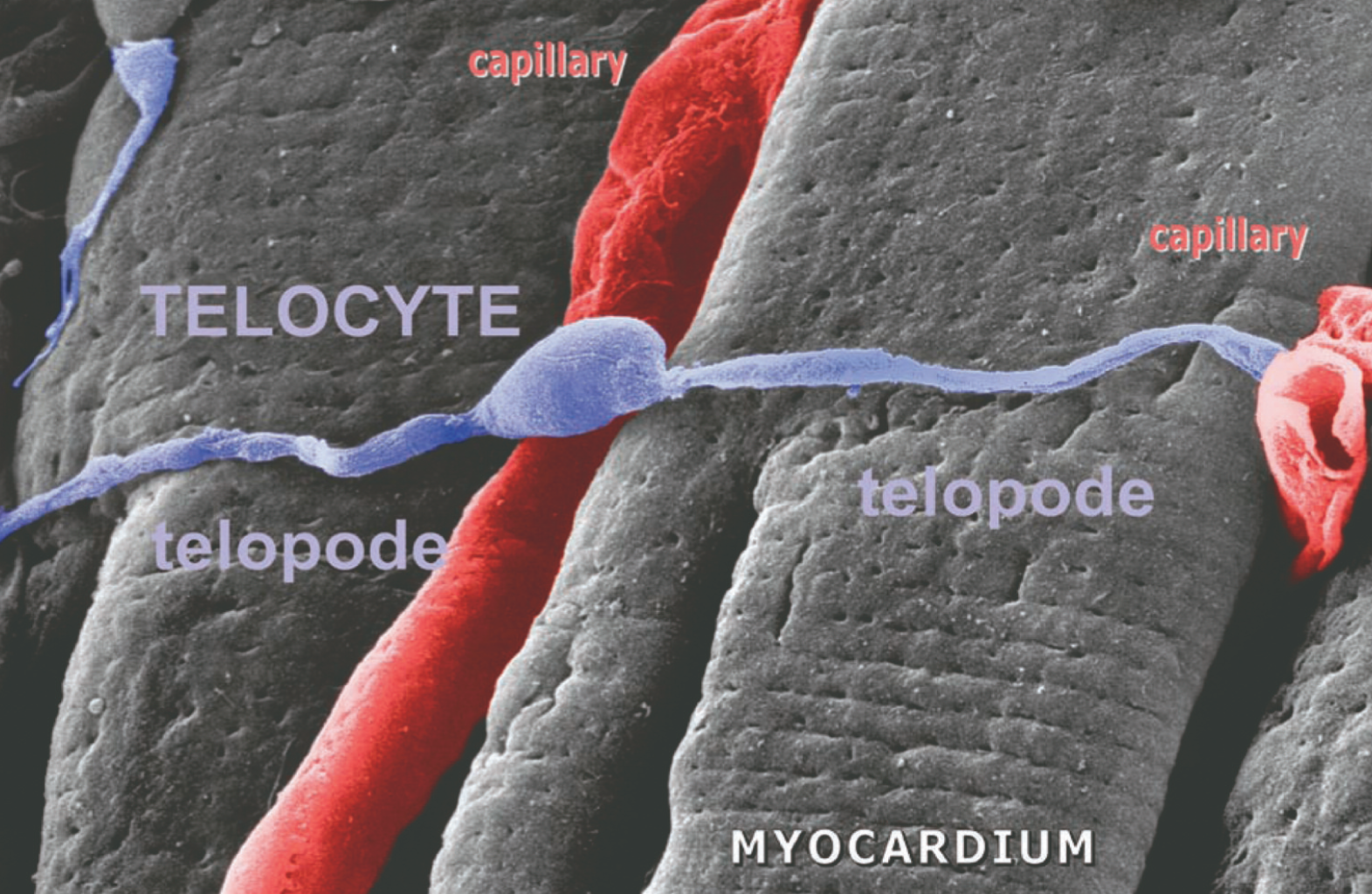
Figure 10. Scanning electron micrograph of monkey left ventricular myocardium. A typical TC is located across the cardiomyocytes, in close contacts with blood capillaries. Note, the cardiomyocytes striations and the openings of T tubules.

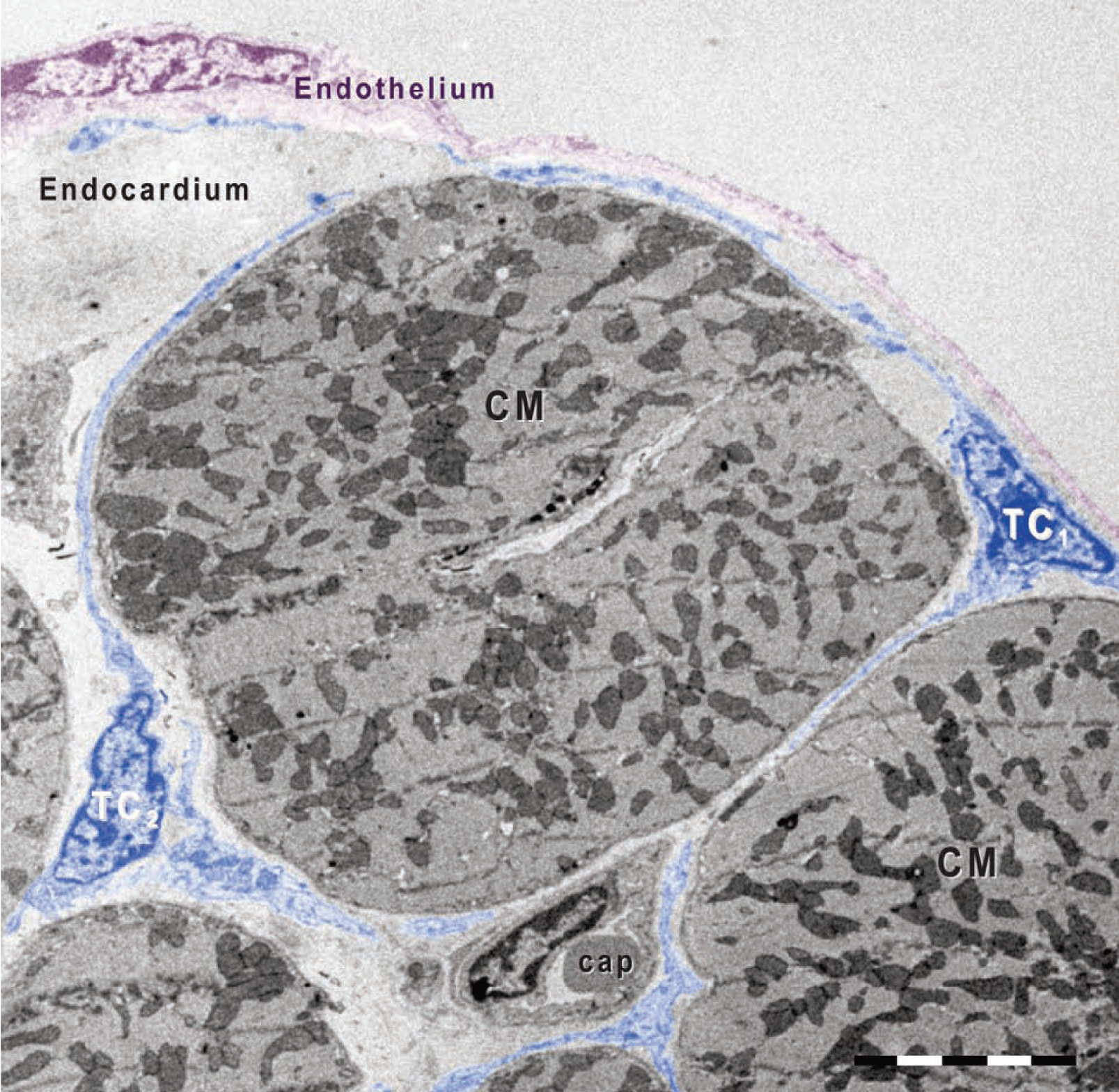
Figure 11. Digitally coloured electron micrograph of mouse ventricular endocardium (burgundy). TC (blue) make an interstitial network in the heart. Subendocardial telocytes (TC_{1}) sends Tp between cardiomyocytes (CM) and communicate with TC_{2}. Cap, blood capillary. Scale bar 5 μm. Reproduced with permission from [4]

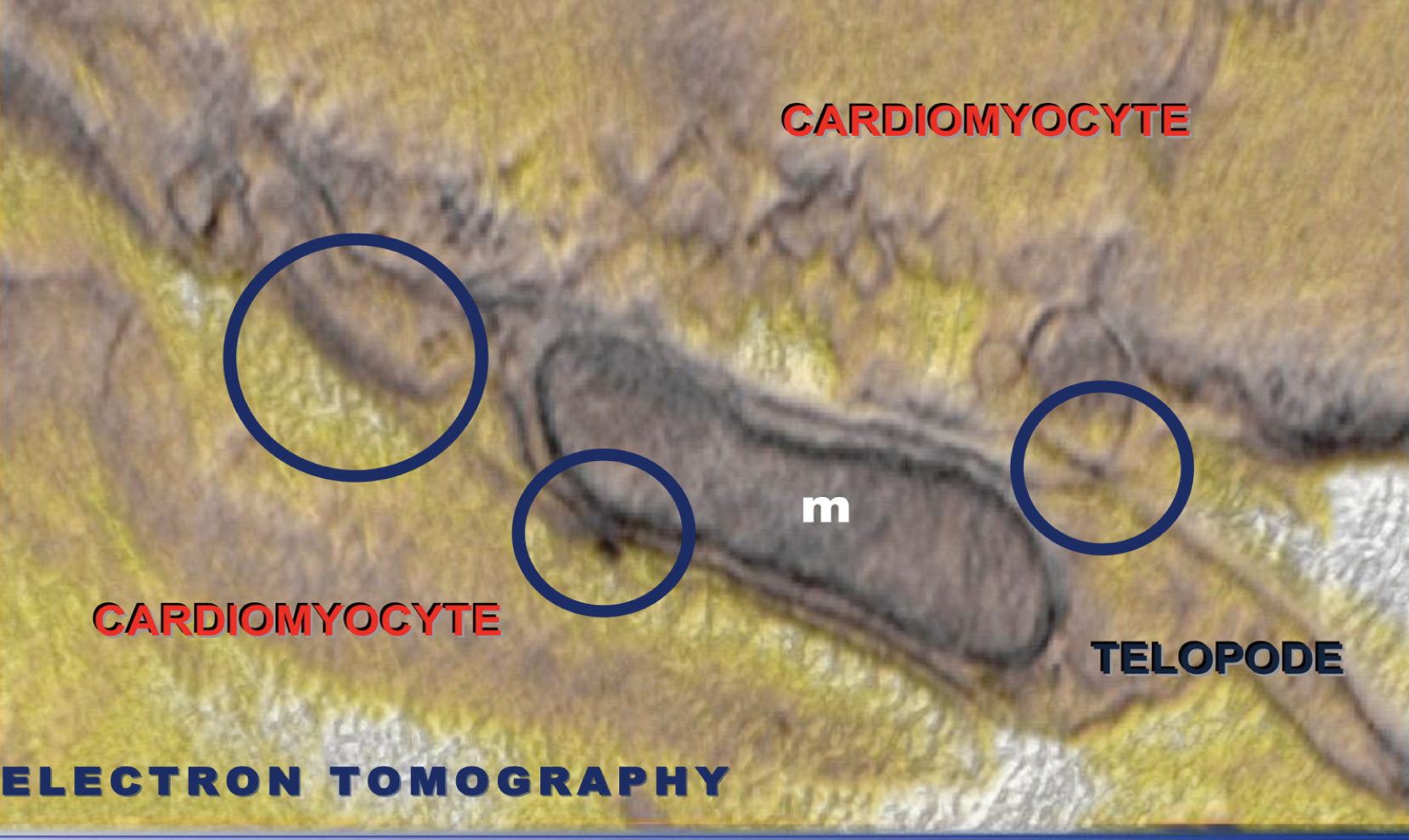
Figure 12. This electron tomography (thick section of about 300 nm) shows nanostructures connecting the TC and cardiomyocytes in adult mouse heart. The bridging structures (encircled) have 10-15 nm and suggest a molecular interaction between the Tp of one TC and the two adjacent cardiomyocytes. The dilated segment of Tp involved in the heterocellular connection (podom) - contains a mitochondrion (m).

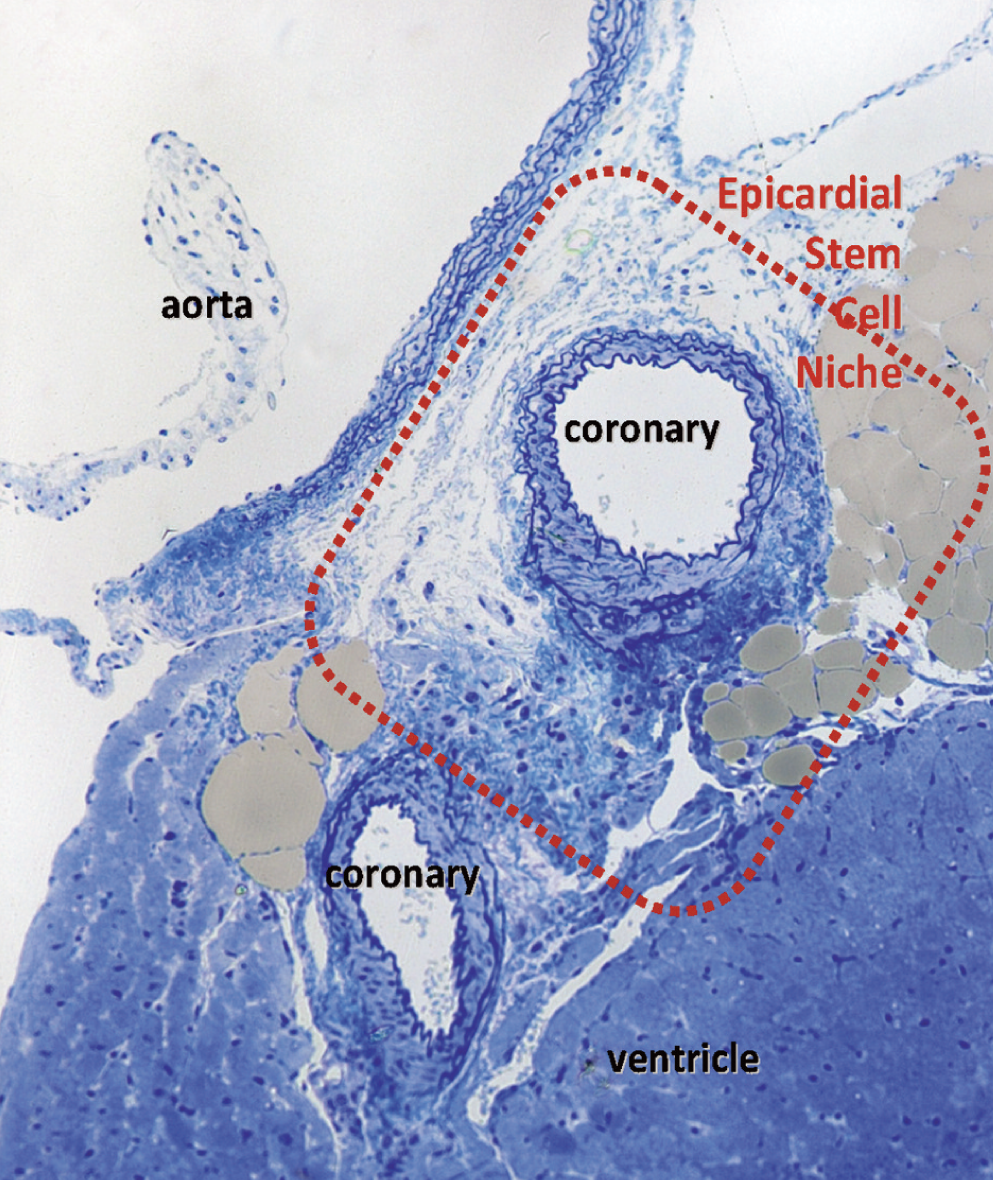
Figure 13. High resolution light microscopy on toluidine blue stained semithin section (~1 μm thick ultramicrotome)

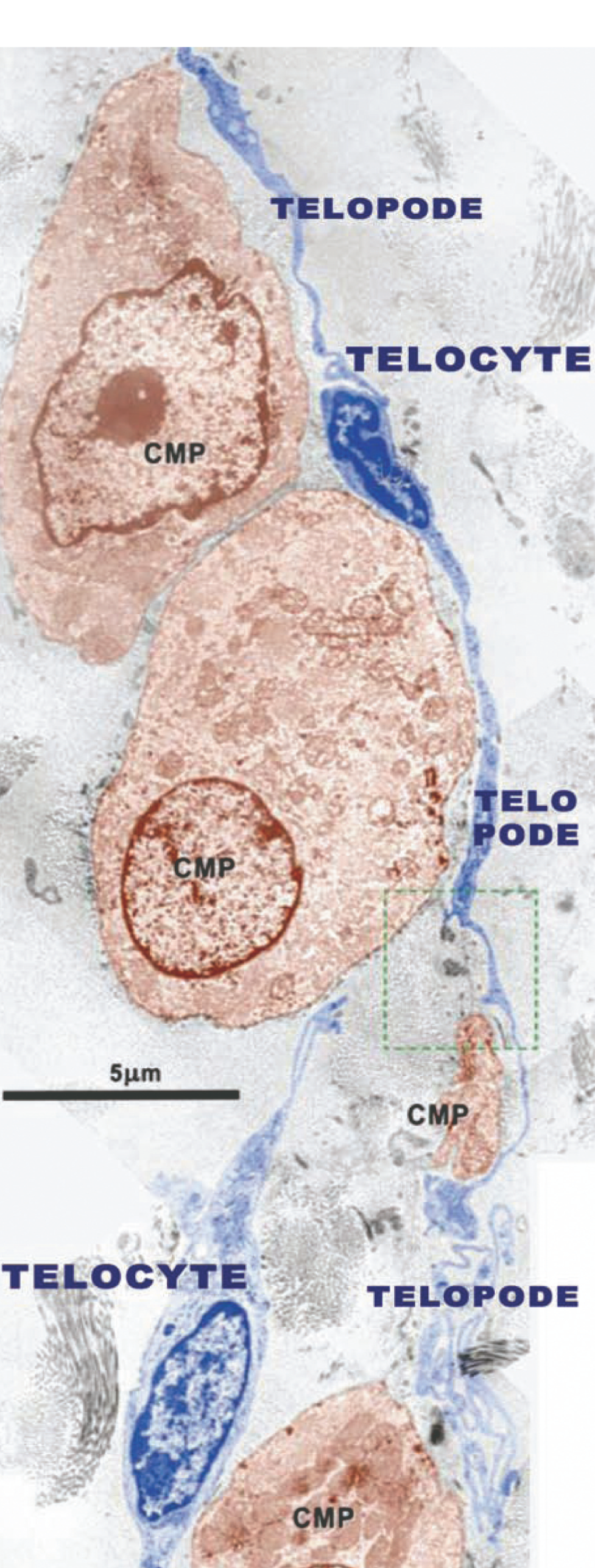
Figure 14. Electron micrographs illustrates the relationships of TC (blue) with cardiomyocyte progenitors (CMP, brown). The Tp run parallel with the main axis of the CMP and seem to establish their direction of development.

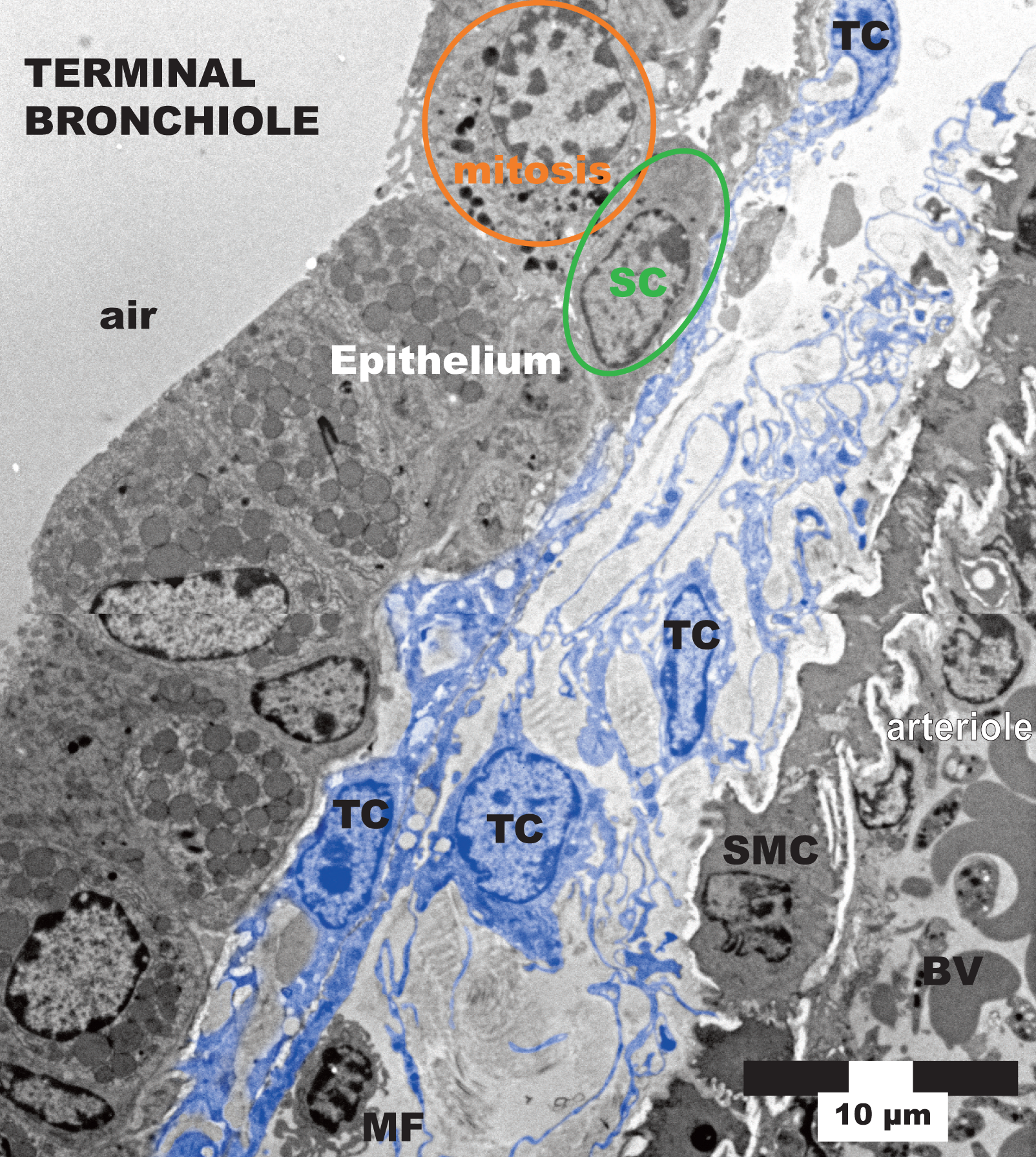
Figure 15. Mice lung. Terminal bronchiole. At least 4 TC with their extensive Tp are visible between the epithelium and an arteriole (SMC - smooth muscle cells). Note, the striking labyrinthine network formed by Tp. In the upper part a mitosis (prophase) is obvious (orange circle). In addition, a putative stem cell (SC, green oval) is in close contacts with telocytes prolongations, establishing a heterocellular junctions, visible at higher magnification only). The tandem TC-SC forms, presumably, a TC-SC niche. In the lower part, a macrophage (MF) makes a stromal synapse with Tp.

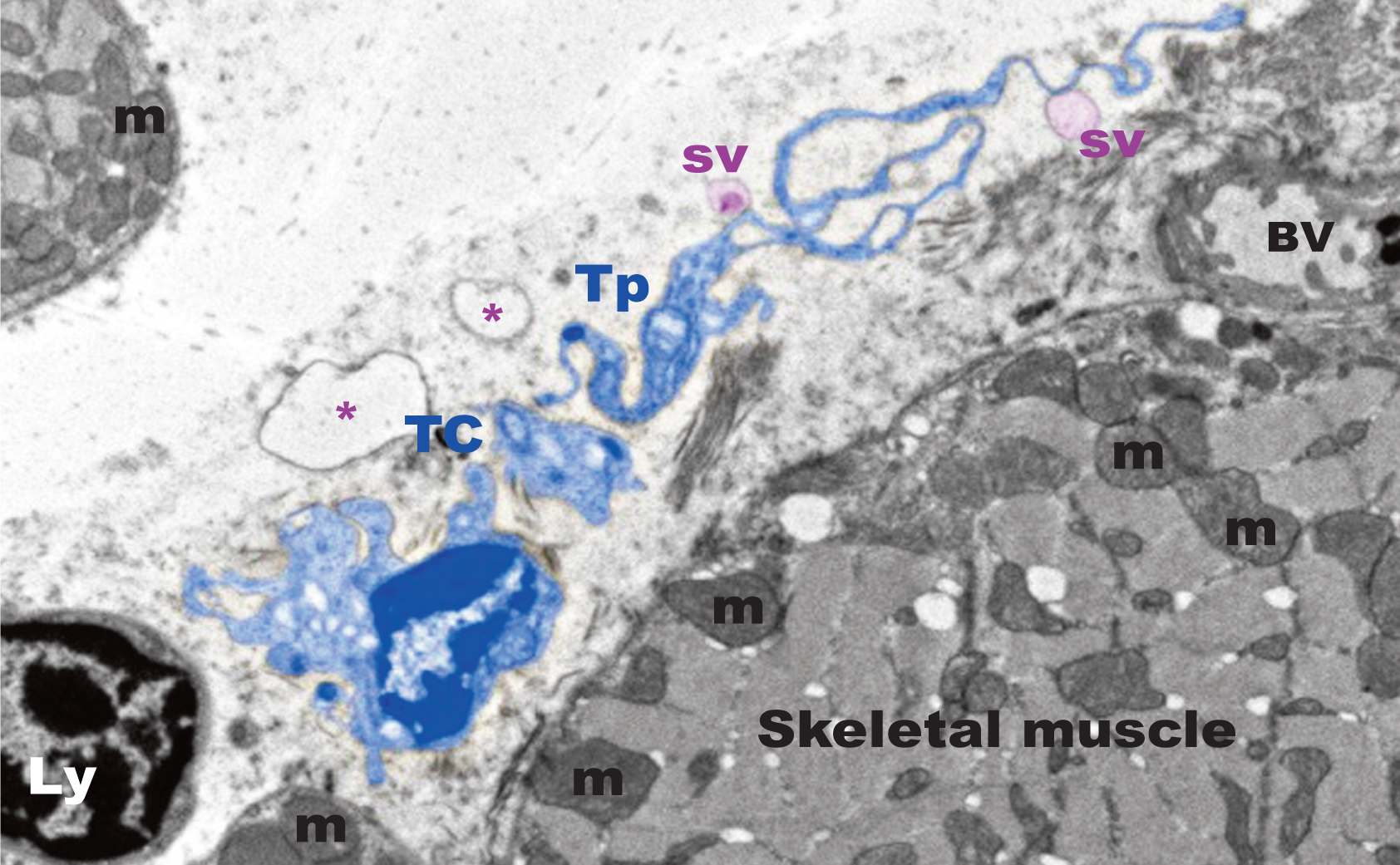
Figure 16. Rat striated skeletal muscle (diaphargm). A typical TC (blue) with two convoluted Tp is shown, by transmission electron microscopy. Note, two shed vesicles (sv, violet). m-mitochondria, Ly-lymphocyte. The asterisks indicate, presumably, two empty exosomes, which probably released their vesicle content. BV-small blood vessel.

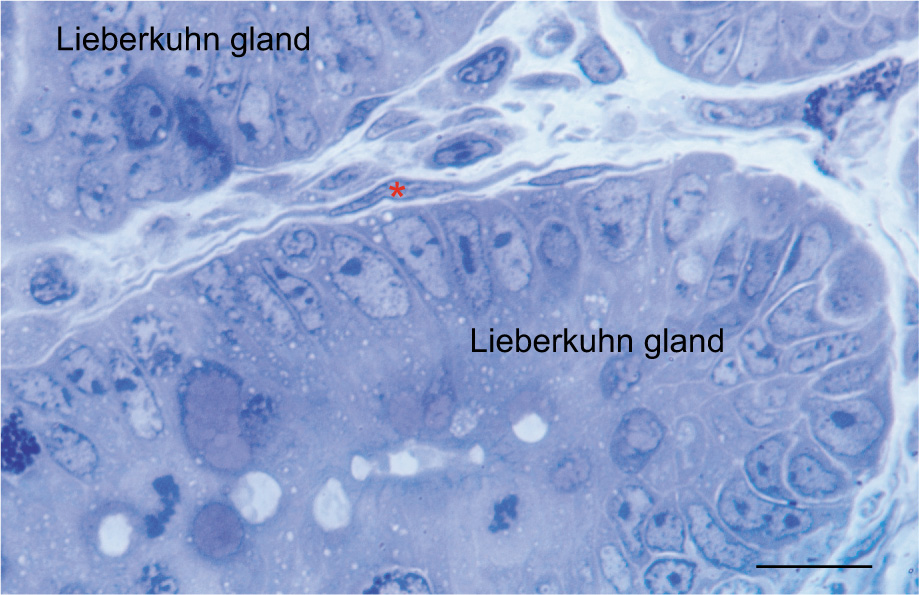
Figure 17. Rat jejunum. Toluidine blue stained Semithin Epon sections of jejunum mucosa showing the bottom of Lieberkuhn glands in transverse section and a telocyte (red star) surrounding one of the gland. Note the spindle-shape body sending off two telopodes, one of which measure at least 50 μm in the section plane.

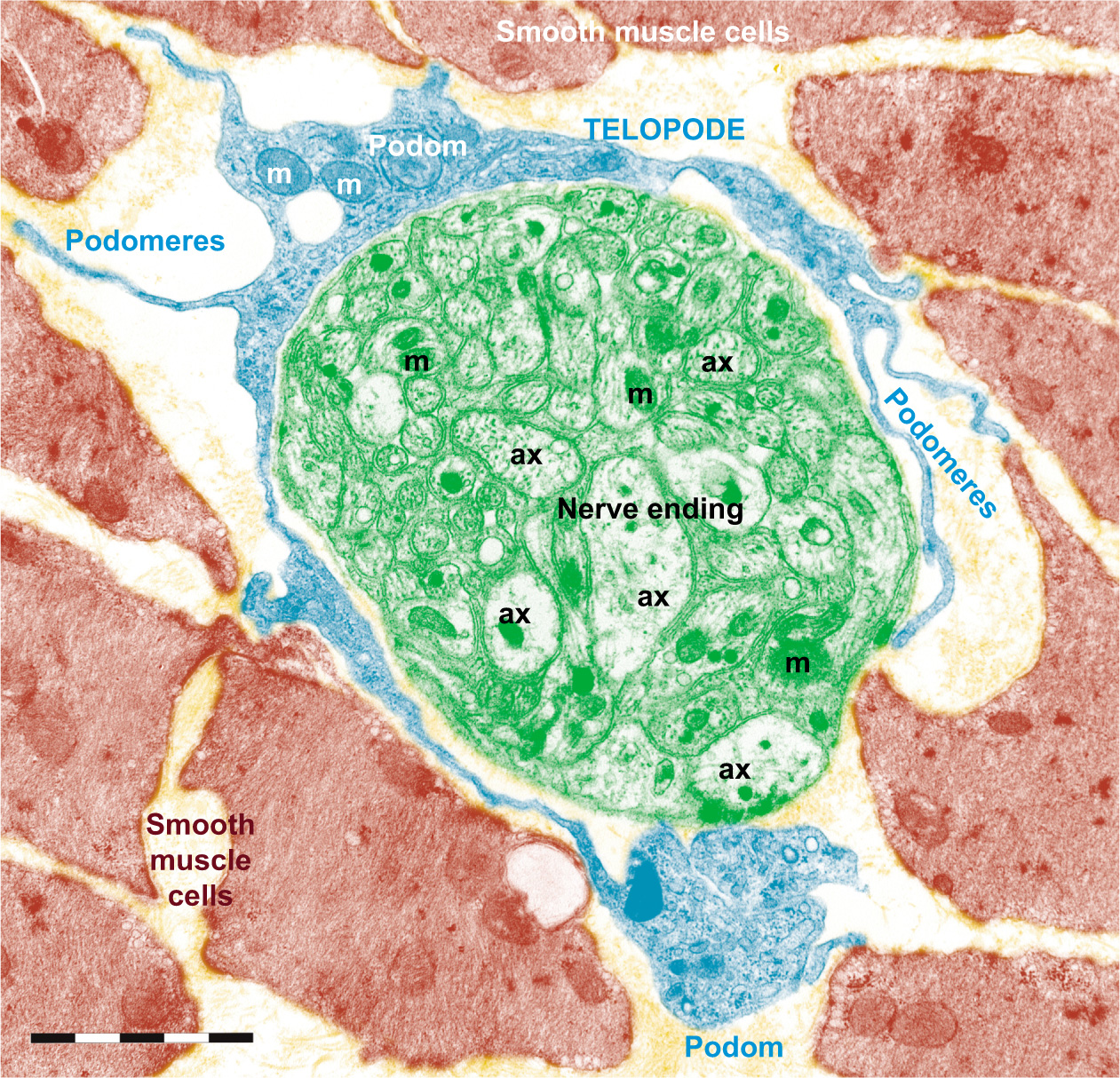
Figure 18. Rat jejunum muscularis mucosa. The photo is a colour-enhanced digital micrograph of a black and white transmission electron microscopy image. A blue telopode of 14.2 μm in the section plane is illustrated around a nerve ending (green) between smooth muscle cells (brown).

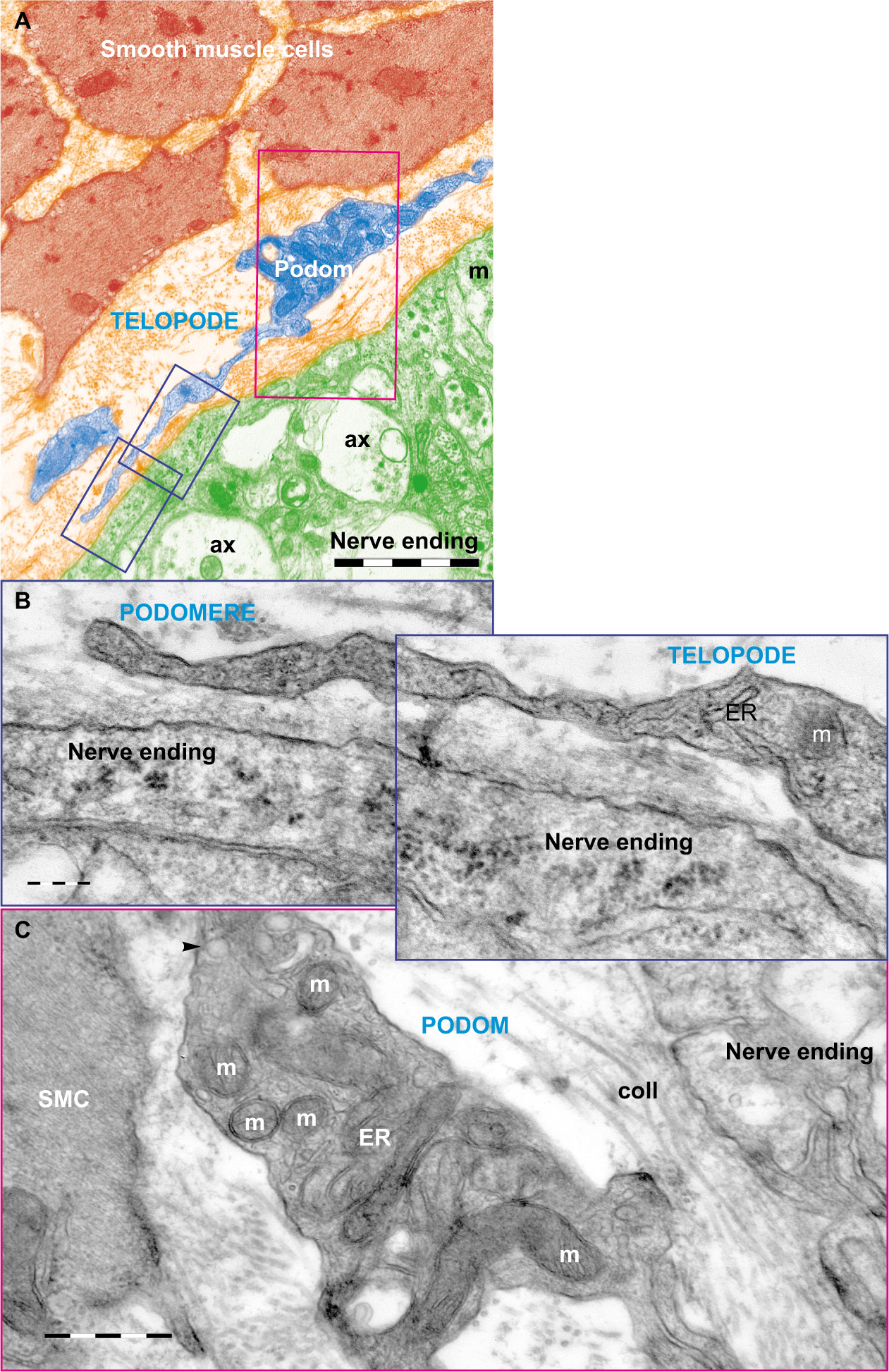
Figure 19. Rat jejunum mucosa. A. This electron microscope image disclose a telopode (blue) in the profound region of lamina propria, close to the muscularis mucosa (brown) and in the proximity of a nerve ending (green). Note the alternating podom and podomere. B. Inset disclosing the organelle details of the podomere – intermediate filaments and free ribosomes, and of the podom – mitochondrion and endoplasmic reticulum cisternae. C. High resolution image illustrating in detail multiple mitochondria, endoplasmic reticulum cisterne and caveolae (arrow).

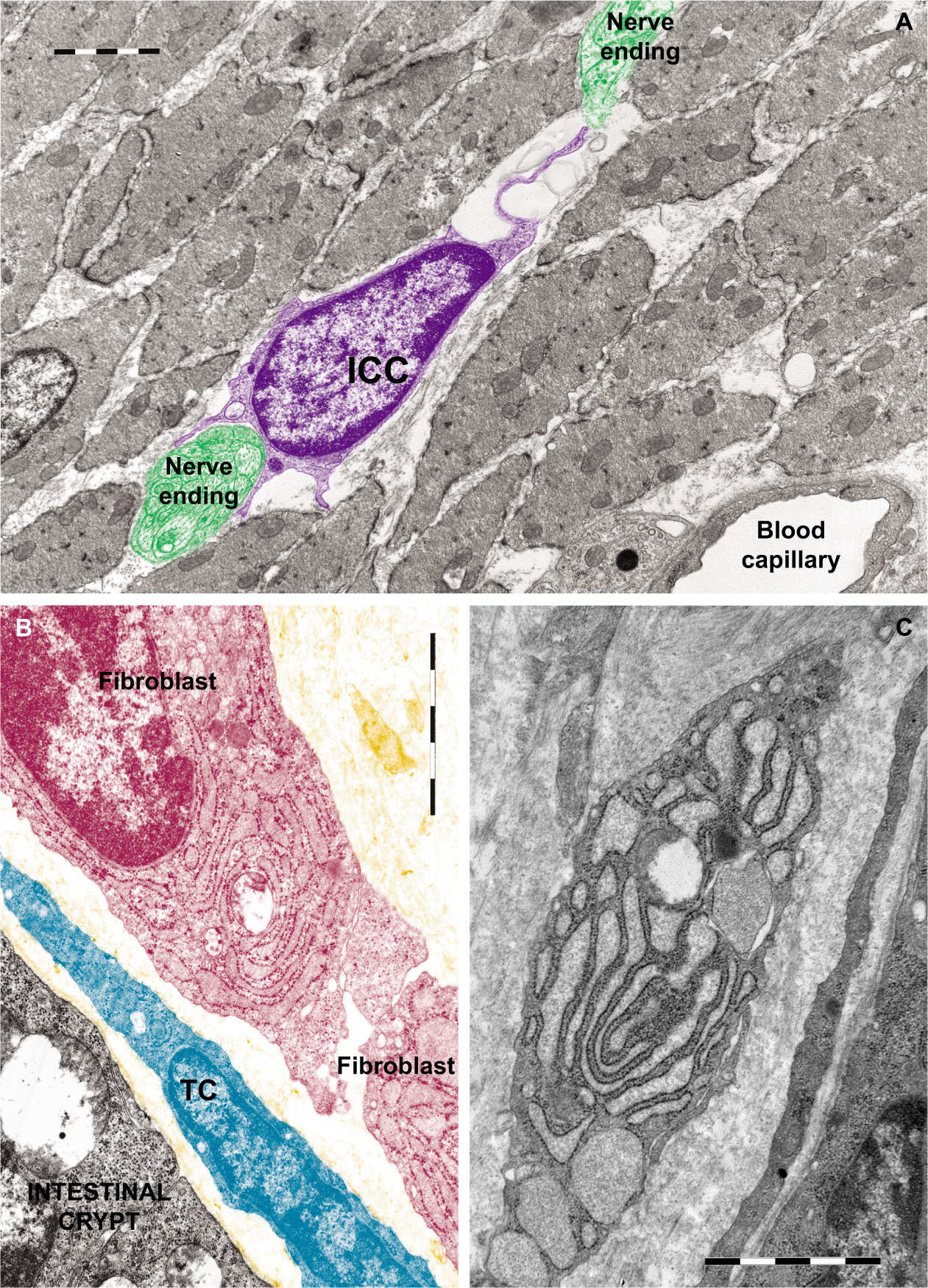
Figure 20. Rat jejunum. A. Photomicrograph of an interstitial cell of Cajal (violet) in muscularis externa. Note the large cell body which extend slender and relatively short connection towards the nerve endings (green). B. Digitally coloured TEM image showing a fibroblast (garnet) and a telocyte (blue) in the lamina propria. C. Coloured transmission electron micrograph (TEM) of a tangential section through a fibroblast cell. The internal structure can be seen, including the dilated rough endoplasmic reticulum (blue). responsible for synthesising collagen. In blue a telopode underlying the intestinal epithelium.

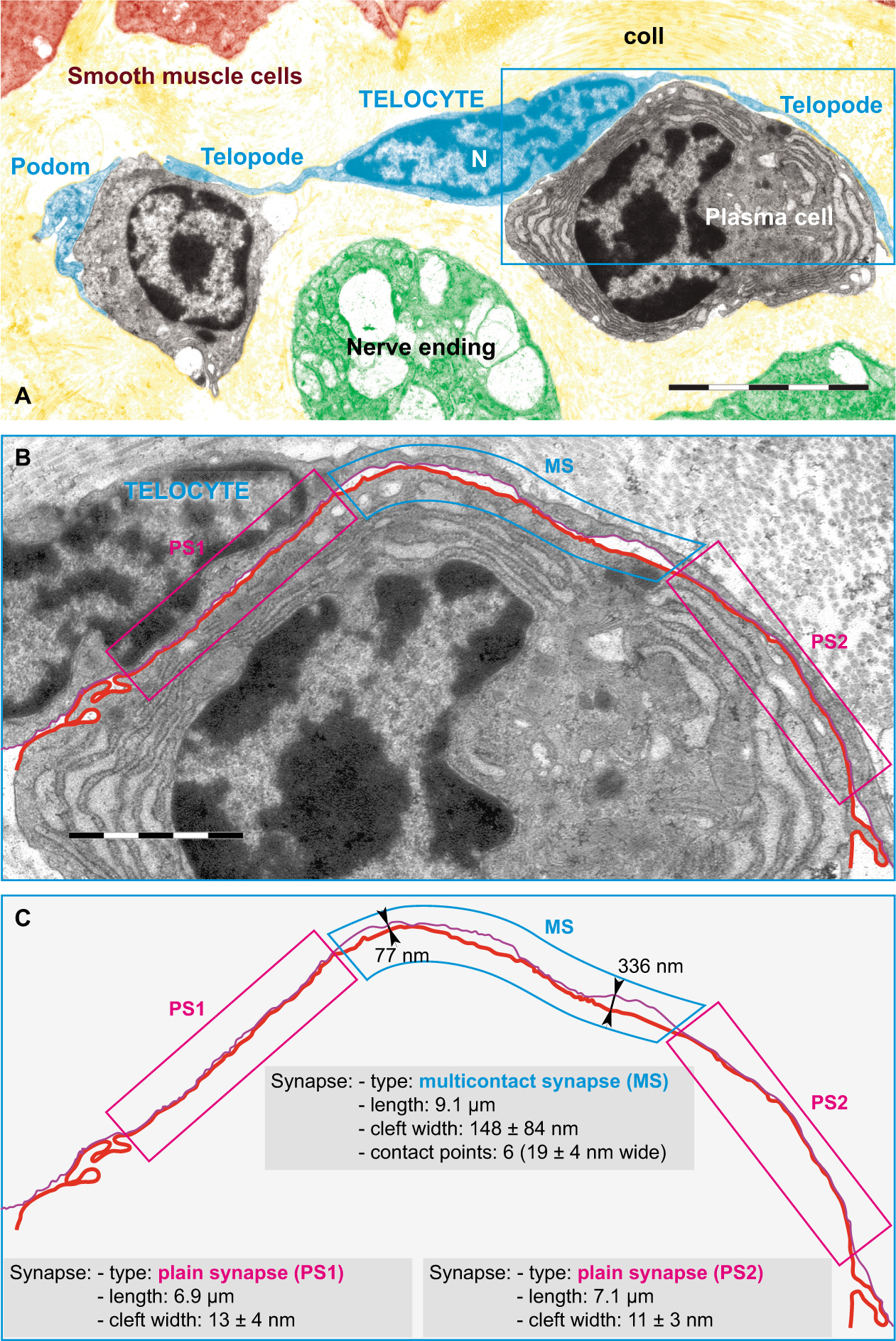
Figure 21. Rat jejunum mucosa. A telocyte (blue) telopode is engaged in different types of synapses with a plasma cell: two plain synapses (PS) and one multicontact synapse (MS) are seen.

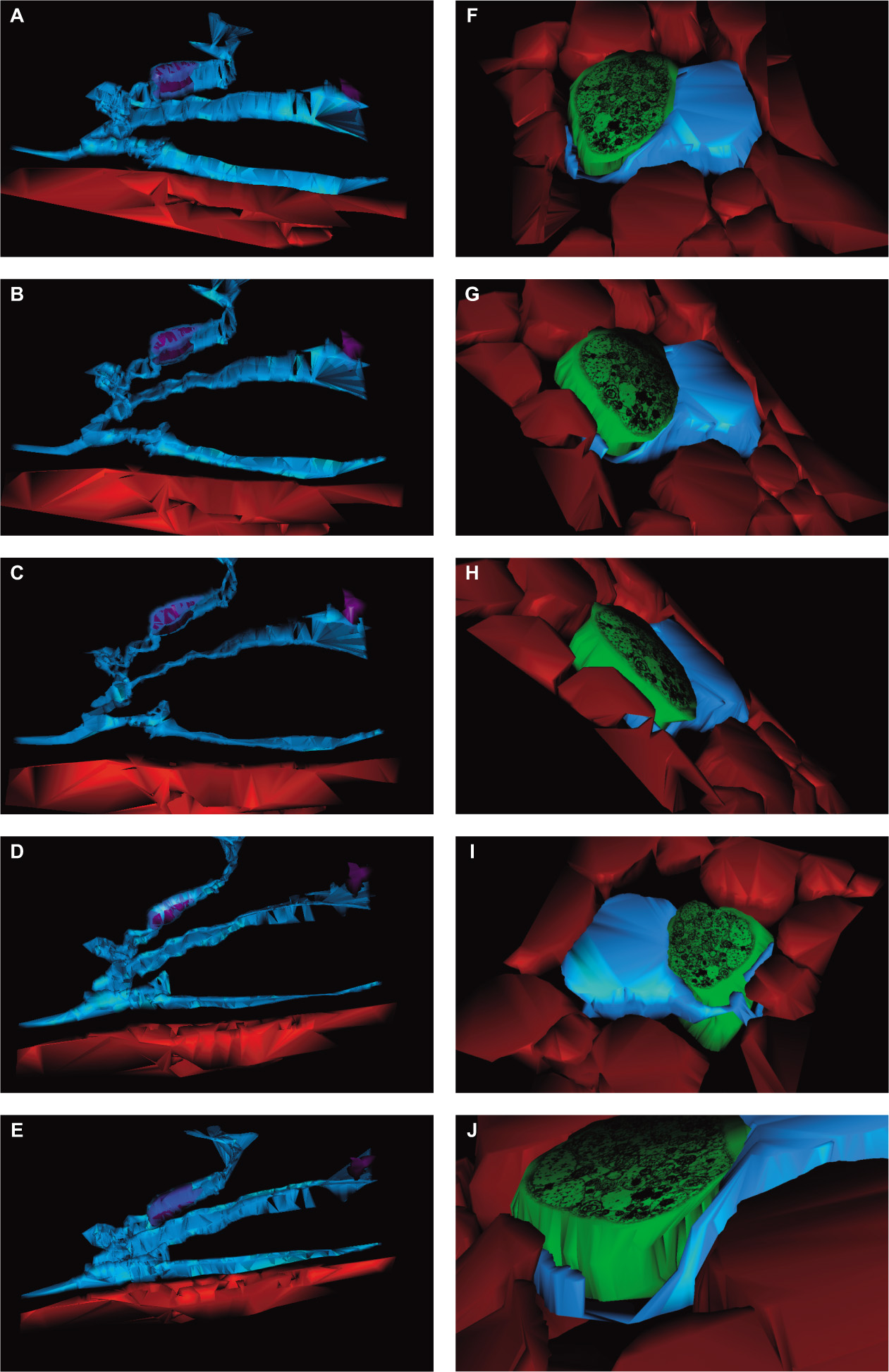
Figure 22. Rat jejunum. A-E. 3D image reconstruction from 5 serial sections of telocytes (blue) in lamina propria: telopodes branching in a 3D pattern. Telocyte's nucleus is colored in violet. F-J. Computer-aided volume rendering and different-angle stereoscopic views of a telocyte (blue) surrounding a nerve fiber (green) in muscularis mucosa (dark red).

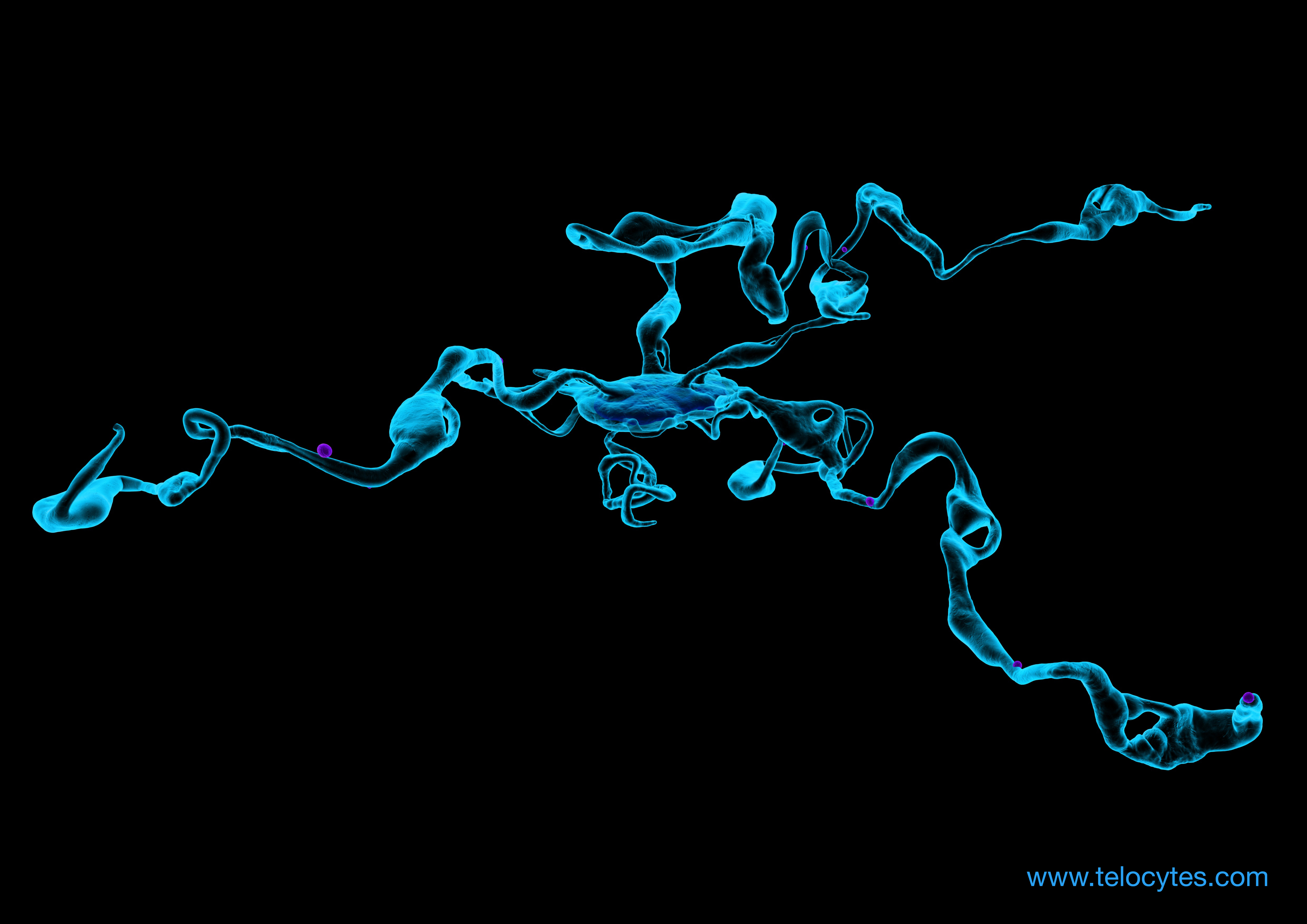
Figure 23. 3D reconstruction of a telocyte with its long telopodes.

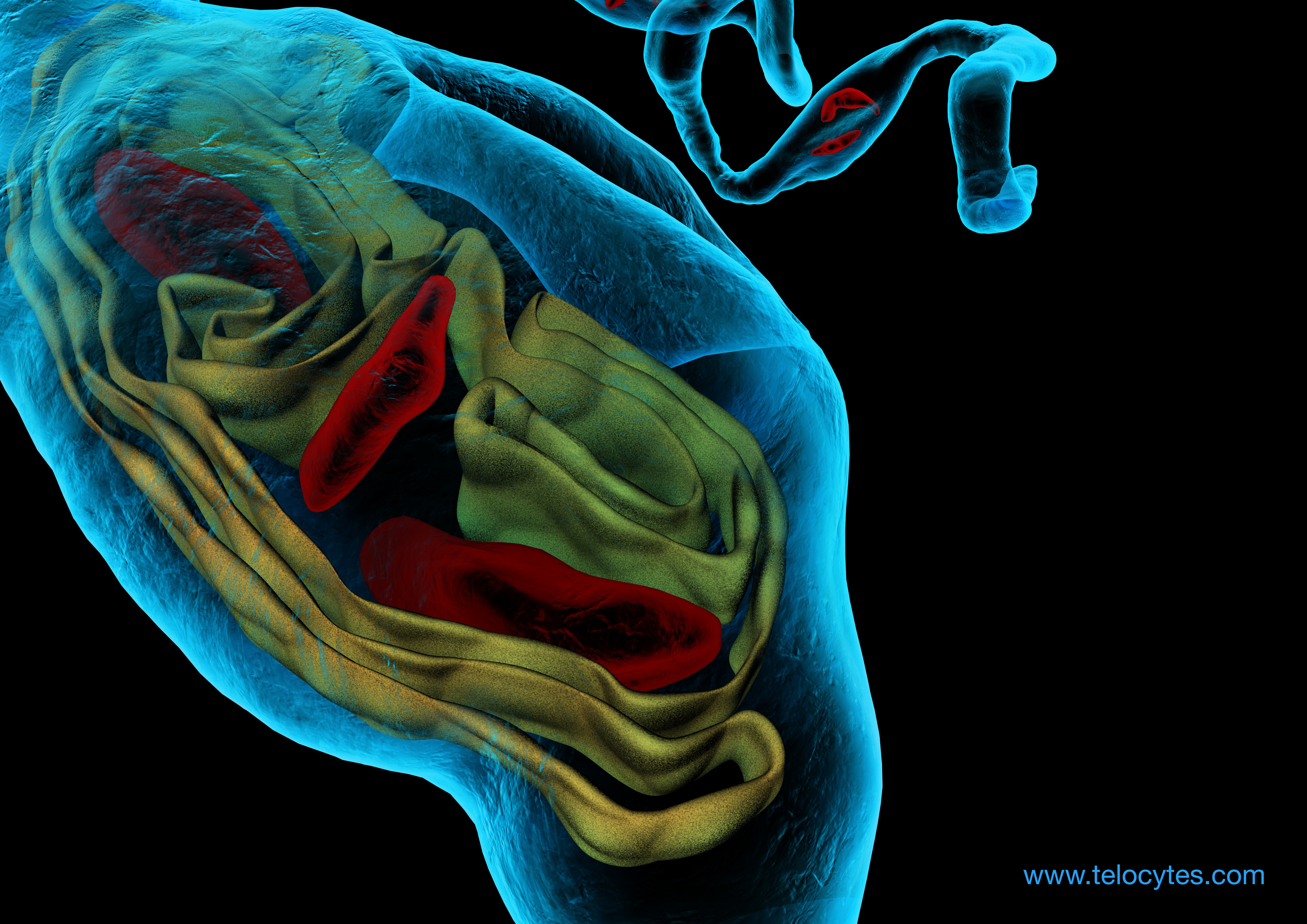
Figure 24. A podom is a dilated portion of a telopode. Note the endoplasmic reticulum in yellow and mitochondria in red.

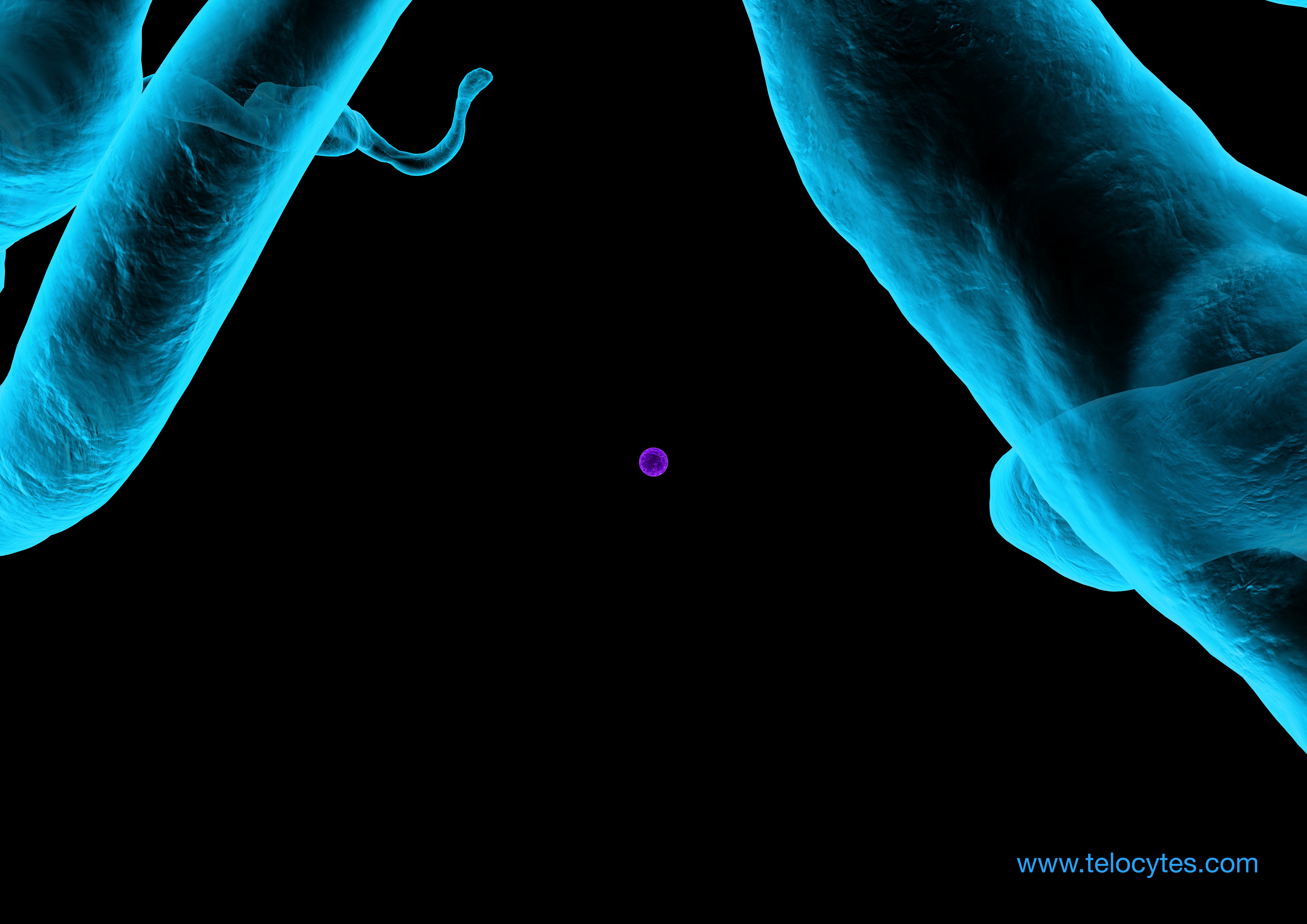
Figure 25. A color representation of convoluted telopodes (blue) and a shedding vesicle (magenta).

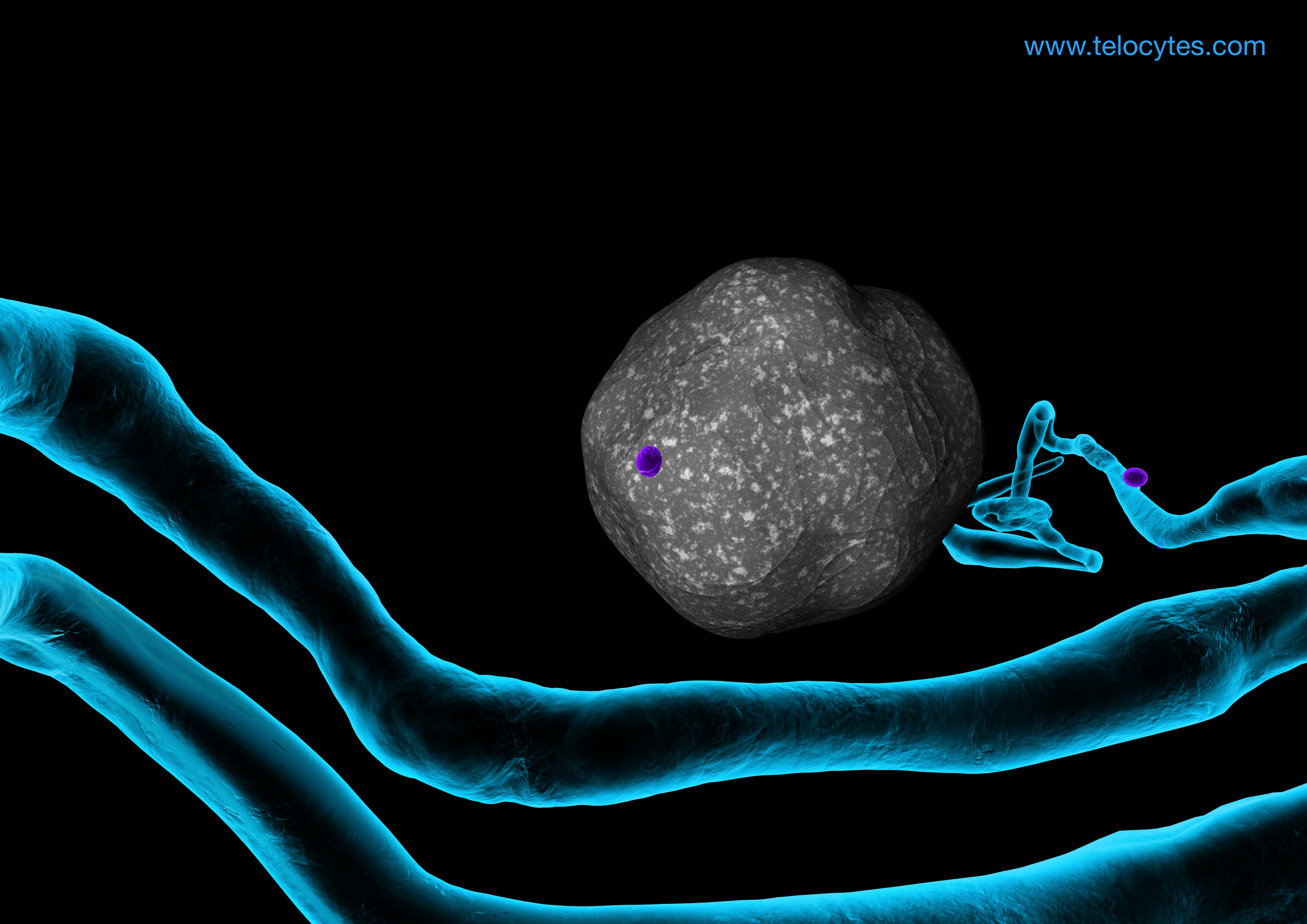
Figure 26. Shedding vesicles (magenta) emerged from the telopodes (blue) and are heading towards a stem cell (gray).

== See also ==
- List of human cell types derived from the germ layers
- Interstitial cell of Cajal, a similar, and potentially equivalent, cell
