= PHD finger protein 7 =

Protein-coding gene in the species Homo sapiens

PHF7

Identifiers
- Aliases: PHF7, HSPC045, HSPC226, NYD-SP6, PHD finger protein 7
- External IDs: MGI: 1919088; GeneCards: PHF7
Available structures
| PDB | Ortholog search: PDBe RCSB |
| PDB | List of PDB id codes 1WEQ |
Enzyme activity
| EC # | BRENDA | ExPASy | KEGG | MetaCyc |
|---|---|---|---|---|
| 2.3.2.27 | ↗ | ↗ | ↗ | ↗ |

Gene location (Human)
| Chr. | Chromosome 3 (human) |
| Band | 3p21.1 | Start | 52,410,660 bp |
| Band | 3p21.1 | End | 52,423,641 bp |

Gene location (Mouse)
| Chr. | Chromosome 14 (mouse) |
| Band | 14|14 B | Start | 30,959,646 bp |
| Band | 14|14 B | End | 30,973,274 bp |
RNA expression pattern
| Bgee | Human / Mouse (ortholog); Top expressed in: right testis; left testis; sperm; testicle; sural nerve; Achilles tendon; rectum; transverse colon; gastric mucosa; skin of leg / Top expressed in: seminiferous tubule; spermatid; spermatocyte; Paneth cell; primary oocyte; internal carotid artery; fossa; external carotid artery; corneal stroma; zygote; More reference expression data |
| BioGPS | n/a |
Orthologs
| Databases | NCBI: entry; OMA: entry |
| Species | Human | Mouse |
| Entrez | 51533 | 71838 |
| Ensembl | ENSG00000010318 | ENSMUSG00000021902 |
| UniProt | Q9BWX1 | Q9DAG9 |
| RefSeq (mRNA) | NM_001278221; NM_016483; NM_173341; NM_001321126; NM_001321127 | NM_027949; NM_001360624; NM_001360625 |
| RefSeq (protein) | NP_001265150; NP_001308055; NP_001308056; NP_057567 | NP_082225; NP_001347553; NP_001347554 |
| Location (UCSC) | Chr 3: 52.41 – 52.42 Mb | Chr 14: 30.96 – 30.97 Mb |
| PubMed search |
- Wikidata
| View/Edit Human | View/Edit Mouse |

PHD finger protein 7 is a protein that in humans is encoded by the PHF7 gene.

== Function ==
Spermatogenesis is a complex process regulated by extracellular and intracellular factors as well as cellular interactions among interstitial cells of the testis, Sertoli cells, and germ cells. This gene is expressed in the testis in Sertoli cells but not germ cells.

The protein encoded by this gene contains plant homeodomain (PHD) finger domains, also known as leukemia associated protein (LAP) domains, believed to be involved in transcriptional regulation. The protein, which localizes to the nucleus of transfected cells, has been implicated in the transcriptional regulation of spermatogenesis. Alternate splicing results in multiple transcript variants of this gene.
