= Neil Theise =

Interstitium Researcher

Neil D. Theise (born 1959 in Connecticut) is a professor of pathology at the New York University Grossman School of Medicine and a researcher on the topics of adult stem cell plasticity and the anatomy of the human interstitium. He is the author of the PEN America Award long-listed book Notes on Complexity: A Scientific Theory of Connection, Consciousness, and Being. He was the Lead Scientist at Pop Test LLC & Palisades Therapeutics LLC for 15 years.

== Biography ==
Neil Theise received a B.A and a B.A.S from the University of Pennsylvania in 1981 and an M.D. from Columbia University, College of Physicians and Surgeons in 1986.

He, along with his co-authors, published a study in 2018 in Scientific Reports that detailed the interstitium as a potential new organ in the human body.

His 2023 book, Notes on Complexity, introduces complexity theory - the science of how complex systems behave - and delves into a holistic exploration of human existence and the universe-wide network of connectivity.

== Publications ==
=== Books ===
- Theise, Neil. Notes on Complexity: A scientific theory of connection, consciousness, and being. New York: Spiegel & Grau, 2023.

=== Selected Publications ===
- Ordner, Jeffrey; Narula, Navneet; Chiriboga, Luis; Zeck, Briana; Majd, Mariam; Gupta, Kapish; Gaglia, Rebecca; Zhou, Fang; Moreira, Andre; Iman, Rami; Ko, Jane P; Le, Linda; Wells, Rebecca G; Theise, Neil D. Continuity of interstitial spaces within and outside the human lung. Journal of anatomy. 2025:247(5):1059-1068.
- Stecco, Carla; Pratt, Rebecca; Nemetz, Laurice D; Schleip, Robert; Stecco, Antonio; Theise, Neil D. The importance of categories. A response to brief communication of Dr. Graham Scarr, "Commentary on the recent article: Stecco et al. (2025) Towards a comprehensive definition of the human fascial system. Journal of Anatomy. DOI: 10.1111/joa.14212". Journal of anatomy. 2025:247(2):410-411.
- Gill, Ryan M; Theise, Neil. Vascular Liver Disease: Emerging Concepts in the Sinusoidal Space. Clinics in liver disease. 2025:29(3):545-561.
- Theise, Neil D; Kohnehshahri, Mehran N; Chiriboga, Luis A; Fyfe, Billie; Cao, Wenqing; Zee, Sui; Imam, Rami; Pichler-Sekulic, Simona; Wells, Rebecca G. EVIDENCE OF INTERSTITIAL CONTINUITY WITHIN AND BEYOND THE HUMAN PANCREAS. Human pathology. 2025.
- Stecco, Carla; Pratt, Rebecca; Nemetz, Laurice D; Schleip, Robert; Stecco, Antonio; Theise, Neil D. Towards a comprehensive definition of the human fascial system. Journal of anatomy. 2025:246(6):1084-1098.
- Theise, Neil D; Tuszynski, Jack A. Non-linearity, complexity, and quantization concepts in biology. Frontiers in human neuroscience. 2025:19.
- Le, Linda; Narula, Navneet; Zhou, Fang; Smereka, Paul; Ordner, Jeffrey; Theise, Neil; Moore, William H; Girvin, Francis; Azour, Lea; Moreira, Andre L; Naidich, David P; Ko, Jane P. Diseases Involving the Lung Peribronchovascular Region: A CT Imaging Pathologic Classification. Chest. 2024:166(4):802.
- de Jong, Iris E M; Theise, Neil D; Wells, Rebecca G. The space of Mall confirmed in humans: A response to "Portal venous branches as an anatomic railroad for a gut-bile duct axis". Journal of hepatology. 2024:80(3):e126-e127.
