= Donald Henry Barron =

American reproductive biologist

- Born: April 9, 1905; Flandreau, South Dakota, United States
- Died: August 24, 1993 (aged 88); Gainesville, Florida, United States
- Resting place: Forest Meadows Memorial Park
- Education: Carleton College (B.A.); Iowa State College (M.S.); Yale University (Ph.D.)
- Spouse: Annette LaCourciere Barron
- Children: Annette McCarthy
- Scientific career
- Fields: reproductive biology
- Workplaces: Yale University; University of Florida

Donald Henry Barron (April 9, 1905 – August 24, 1993) was an American reproductive biologist who was born in Flandreau, South Dakota and received his B.A. in Chemistry at Carleton College, his M.S. in Botany at Iowa State College and his Ph.D. at Yale University. In March 1933, he joined Edgar D. Adrian's laboratory in Cambridge University where he investigated the Slow potential wave in spinal cord collaborated with Bryan Matthews and received an honorary M.A. degree from there in 1936.

Barron and his family to return to the United States in 1940. From 1943 to 1969, he worked at Yale and then moved to University of Florida until he retired, enjoyed a distinguished career as a biologist, anatomist, neurophysiologist, and fetal-placental physiologist.

Donald Barron died August 24, 1993, in Gainesville, Florida. He is buried at Forest Meadows Memorial Park and Mausoleum Central in Gainesville, Florida.
