= Peter Matthews (physiologist) =

British physiologist (1928–2020)

Peter Bryan Conrad Matthews FRS (23 December 1928 – 2 March 2020) was a British physiologist who made particular contributions to the study of muscle spindles. He was elected as fellow of the Royal Society in 1973. He was the Professor of Sensorimotor Physiology at the University of Oxford and a fellow of Christ Church.

While in Oxford he worked on proprioception.

== Biography ==
He was born in Cambridge to the physiologist Sir Bryan Harold Cabot Matthews and Rachel Eckhard. After schooling at King's College School, Cambridge he moved to Marlborough College in 1942. He then studied Natural Sciences at King's College, Cambridge, before moving to Oxford for studies in clinical medicine.

He married Margaret Blears, an autonomic physiologist. Margaret (Matthews) became a Fellow at Lady Margaret Hall; they had two children, including Hugh Matthews, a Reader in Sensory Physiology at the University of Cambridge.

In 1956 he was appointed University Demonstrator in the Department of Physiology, Oxford, Dr Lee’s Reader in Anatomy in 1958 and Official Student (Fellow) at Christ Church, then becoming a University Lecturer in 1961. He subsequently became a Professor of Sensorimotor Physiology in Oxford, known particularly for his work on muscle spindles.

== Selected works ==
=== Monographs ===
- Matthews, Peter (1972). Mammalian muscle receptors and their central actions. London: Edward Arnold. ISBN 9780713141917.

=== Journal articles ===
- Matthews, P. B. C. (10 October 1962). "The differentiation of two types of fusimotor fibre by their effects on the dynamic response of muscle spindle primary endings". Quarterly Journal of Experimental Physiology and Cognate Medical Sciences. 47 (4): 324–333. doi:10.1113/expphysiol.1962.sp001616. PMID 13933877.
