= Bryan Matthews =

British professor of physiology

Bryan Harold Cabot Matthews
- Born: 14 June 1906
- Died: 23 July 1986
- Scientific career
- Fields: high altitude physiology and aviation medicine

Sir Bryan Harold Cabot Matthews, CBE, FRS (14 June 1906 – 23 July 1986) was Professor of Physiology, Cambridge University 1952–1973, emeritus professor thereafter and Life Fellow of King's College, Cambridge.

Matthews was educated at Clifton College and King's College, Cambridge, where he took a degree in physiology and became a research student of Edgar D. Adrian, working with him, and later with Donald Henry Barron on the recording of single nerve impulses. He was elected Fellow of the Royal Society in 1940 for his foundational work on electro-encephalography, but later moved into the study of high-altitude physiology and aviation medicine.

He was a fellow of King's College from 1929, onwards and was appointed director of studies in medicine in 1932. During the Second World War he was the appointed the head of the Royal Air Force's Physiological Research Unit, followed by a short-term position as the head of the RAF Institute of Aviation Medicine (1944-6). Matthews returned to Cambridge and succeeded Adrian as the professor of physiology from 1952, until his retirement in 1973.

Matthews married Rachel Eckhard, who has been a research student in the laboratory where he was an undergraduate, having two daughters and a son (Peter Matthews, who became a professor of physiology in Oxford). The marriage was later dissolved and he remarried Audrey Stewart.

Matthews' elder brother was the zoologist Leonard Harrison Matthews and his uncle the chemical scientist Lt-Col Edward Frank Harrison, inventor of the first serviceable gas mask.
