= Ole Paulsen =

Ole Paulsen is the current Chair of Physiology (1883) in the Department of Physiology, Development and Neuroscience at the University of Cambridge.

Paulsen holds a medical degree and a doctorate from the University of Oslo. He was appointed Departmental Lecturer in the Department of Pharmacology, Oxford, in 1994. He was appointed University Lecturer in the University Laboratory of Physiology in 2000, along with a Fellowship at Keble College. He was also head of the Neuronal Oscillations Group.

In January 2010 he was elected to the Chair of Physiology (1883) in the Department of Physiology, Development and Neuroscience at the University of Cambridge.

As of 2026, he was a fellow of St John's College, Cambridge.

He is a fellow and past president of The Physiological Society.

== Selected publications ==
- Oye, I; Paulsen, O; Maurset, A (March 1992). "Effects of ketamine on sensory perception: evidence for a role of N-methyl-D-aspartate receptors". The Journal of Pharmacology and Experimental Therapeutics. 260 (3): 1209–1213. doi:10.1016/S0022-3565(25)11430-4.
- Cobb, S. R.; Buhl, E. H.; Halasy, K.; Paulsen, O.; Somogyi, P. (November 1995). "Synchronization of neuronal activity in hippocampus by individual GABAergic interneurons". Nature. 378 (6552): 75–78. doi:10.1038/378075a0.
- Sprengel, Rolf; Suchanek, Bettina; Amico, Carla; Brusa, Rossella; Burnashev, Nail; Rozov, Andrei; Hvalby, Øivind; Jensen, Vidar; Paulsen, Ole; Andersen, Per; Kim, Jeansok J; Thompson, Richard F; Sun, William; Webster, Lorna C; Grant, Seth G.N; Eilers, Jens; Konnerth, Arthur; Li, Jianying; McNamara, James O; Seeburg, Peter H (January 1998). "Importance of the Intracellular Domain of NR2 Subunits for NMDA Receptor Function In Vivo". Cell. 92 (2): 279–289. doi:10.1016/S0092-8674(00)80921-6.
- Fisahn, André; Pike, Fenella G.; Buhl, Eberhard H.; Paulsen, Ole (July 1998). "Cholinergic induction of network oscillations at 40 Hz in the hippocampus in vitro". Nature. 394 (6689): 186–189. doi:10.1038/28179.
- Paulsen, Ole; Moser, Edvard (1 July 1998). "A model of hippocampal memory encoding and retrieval: GABAergic control of synaptic plasticity". Trends in Neurosciences. 21 (7): 273–278. doi:10.1016/S0166-2236(97)01205-8. ISSN 0166-2236.
- Paulsen, O; Sejnowski, T (1 April 2000). "Natural patterns of activity and long-term synaptic plasticity". Current Opinion in Neurobiology. 10 (2): 172–180. doi:10.1016/S0959-4388(00)00076-3. PMC 2900254.
- Mann, Edward O.; Paulsen, Ole (July 2007). "Role of GABAergic inhibition in hippocampal network oscillations". Trends in Neurosciences. 30 (7): 343–349. doi:10.1016/j.tins.2007.05.003.
- Giandomenico, Stefano L.; Mierau, Susanna B.; Gibbons, George M.; Wenger, Lea M. D.; Masullo, Laura; Sit, Timothy; Sutcliffe, Magdalena; Boulanger, Jerome; Tripodi, Marco; Derivery, Emmanuel; Paulsen, Ole; Lakatos, András; Lancaster, Madeline A. (April 2019). "Cerebral organoids at the air–liquid interface generate diverse nerve tracts with functional output". Nature Neuroscience. 22 (4): 669–679. doi:10.1038/s41593-019-0350-2. PMC 6436729.
