= Professor of Physiology (Cambridge) =

Chair at the University of Cambridge

The Professorship of Physiology, also known as the Chair of Physiology (1883), is a chair at the University of Cambridge. In 2006, the Department of Physiology was merged with the Department of Anatomy to form the Department of Physiology, Development and Neuroscience where the chair is now based.

== List of Professors of Physiology ==
- Michael Foster (1883–1903)
- John Newport Langley (1903–1925)
- Joseph Barcroft (1926–1937)
- Edgar Adrian (1937–1951)
- Bryan Harold Cabot Matthews (1952–1973)
- Richard Darwin Keynes (1973–1987)
- Ian Michael Glynn (1986–1995)
- Roger Christopher Thomas (1996–2006)
- Ole Paulsen (2010–present)
