= Interstitium =

Fluid-filled space in organs

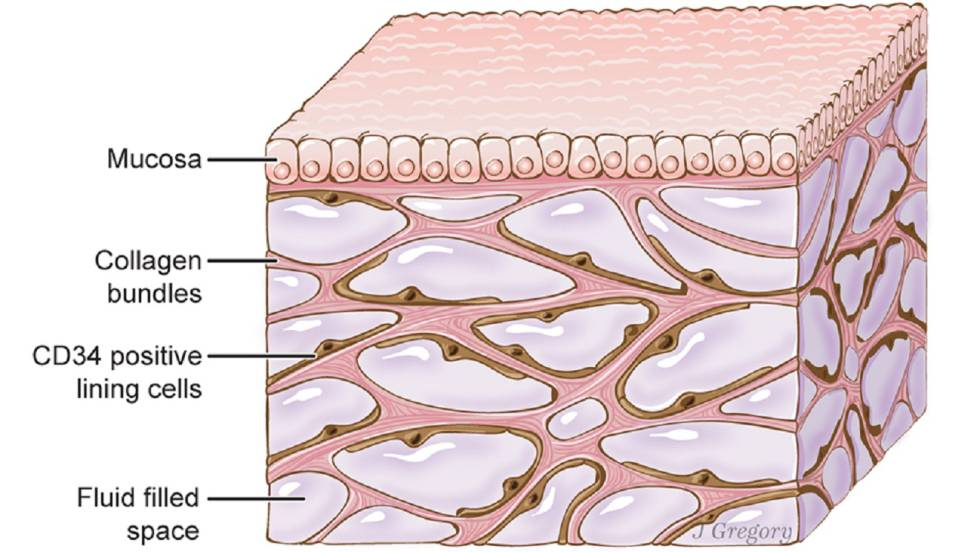
- Three-dimensional schematic of the interstitium, a fluid-filled space supported by a network of collagen

In anatomy, the interstitium is a contiguous fluid-filled space existing between a structural barrier, such as a cell membrane or the skin, and internal structures, such as organs, including muscles and the circulatory system. Fluid in this space – the interstitial fluid – is composed of solutes and water draining into the lymphatic system.

The interstitial compartment is composed of connective tissues comprising an extracellular matrix, which is situated outside the blood, lymphatic vessels, and the parenchyma of organs. The interstitium has a role in regulating solute concentration, protein transport, and hydrostatic pressure, which may affect human pathology and physiological responses, such as edema, inflammation, and shock.

== Structure ==
The non-fluid parts of the interstitium are predominantly collagen types I, III, and V; elastin; and glycosaminoglycans, such as hyaluronan and proteoglycans, that are cross-linked to form a honeycomb-like reticulum. Collagen bundles of the extracellular matrix form scaffolding with a high tensile strength. Interstitial cells (e.g., fibroblasts, dendritic cells, adipocytes, interstitial cells of Cajal and inflammatory cells, such as macrophages and mast cells), serve a variety of structural and immune functions. Fibroblasts synthesize the production of structural molecules as well as enzymes that break down polymeric molecules. Such structural components exist both for the general interstitium of the body, and within individual organs, such as the myocardial interstitium of the heart, the renal interstitium of the kidneys, and the pulmonary interstitium of the lungs.

The interstitium in the submucosae of visceral organs, the dermis, superficial fascia, and perivascular adventitia are fluid-filled spaces supported by a collagen bundle lattice. Blind end, highly permeable, lymphatic capillaries extend into the interstitium. The fluid spaces communicate with draining lymph nodes, although they do not have lining cells or structures of lymphatic channels. Interstitial fluid entering the lymphatic system becomes lymph, which is transported through lymphatic vessels until it empties into the microcirculation and the venous system.

== Functions ==
The interstitial fluid is a reservoir and transportation system for nutrients and solutes distributing among organs, cells, and capillaries, for signaling molecules communicating between cells, and for antigens and cytokines participating in immune regulation. The structure of the gel reticulum plays a role in the distribution of solutes across the interstitium, as the microstructure of the extracellular matrix in some parts excludes larger molecules (exclusion volume). The density of the collagen matrix fluctuates with the fluid volume of the interstitium. Increasing fluid volume is associated with a decrease in matrix fiber density, and a lower exclusion volume.

The total fluid volume of the interstitium during health represents about 20% of body weight, but the interstitial space is dynamic and may change in volume and composition during immune responses and in conditions such as cancer, specifically within the interstitium of tumors. The amount of interstitial fluid varies from about 50% of the tissue weight in skin to about 10% in skeletal muscle. Interstitial fluid pressure is variable, ranging from −1 to −4 mmHg in tissues like the skin, intestine and lungs to 21 to 24 mmHg in the liver, kidney and myocardium. Generally, increasing interstitial volume is associated with increased interstitial pressure and microvascular filtration.

The renal interstitium facilitates solute and water transport between blood and urine in the vascular and tubular elements of the kidneys, and water reabsorption through changes in solute concentrations and hydrostatic gradients. The myocardial interstitium participates in ionic exchanges associated with the spread of electrical events. The pulmonary interstitium allows for fluctuations in lung volume between inspiration and expiration.

The composition and chemical properties of the interstitial fluid vary among organs and undergo changes in chemical composition during normal function, as well as during body growth, conditions of inflammation, and development of diseases, as in heart failure and chronic kidney disease.

== Disease ==
In people with lung diseases, heart disease, cancer, kidney disease, immune disorders, and periodontal disease, the interstitial fluid and lymph system are sites where disease mechanisms may develop. Interstitial fluid flow is associated with the migration of cancer cells to metastatic sites. The enhanced permeability and retention effects refers to increased interstitial flow causing a neutral or reversed pressure differential between blood vessels and healthy tissue, limiting the distribution of intravenous drugs to tumors, which under other circumstances display a high-pressure gradient at their periphery.

Changes in interstitial volume and pressure play critical roles in the onset of conditions like shock and inflammation. During hypovolemic shock, digestive enzymes and inflammatory agents diffuse to the interstitial space, then drain into the mesenteric lymphatic system and enter into circulation, contributing to systemic inflammation. Accumulating fluid in the interstitial space (interstitial edema) is caused by increased microvascular pressure and permeability, a positive feedback loop mechanism resulting in an associated in increasing the rate of microvascular filtration into the interstitial space. Decreased lymphatic drainage due to blockage can compound these effects. Interstitial edema can prevent oxygen diffusion across tissue and in the brain, kidney and intestines lead to the onset of compartment syndrome.

== See also ==
- Extracellular matrix
- Extracellular fluid
