= Slow-wave potential =

Rhythmic electrophysiological event in the gastrointestinal tract

A slow-wave potential is a rhythmic electrophysiological event in the gastrointestinal tract. The normal conduction of slow waves is one of the key regulators of gastrointestinal motility. Slow waves are generated and propagated by a class of pacemaker cells called the interstitial cells of Cajal, which also act as intermediates between nerves and smooth muscle cells. Slow waves generated in interstitial cells of Cajal spread to the surrounding smooth muscle cells and control motility.

== Description ==
In the human enteric nervous system, the slow-wave threshold is the slow-wave potential which must be reached before a slow wave can be propagated in smooth muscle of the gut wall. When the amplitude of slow waves in smooth muscle cells reaches the slow-wave threshold — the L-type Ca^{2+} channels are activated, resulting in calcium influx and initiation of motility. Slow waves are generated at unique intrinsic frequencies by the interstitial Cajal cells, even within the same organ. Entrainment of these different intrinsic frequencies through electrical coupling allows these unique intrinsic frequencies to occur at a single frequency within the stomach and segments of the small intestine. Electron microscopic and dye coupling studies to date have confirmed gap junctions as the major coupling mechanisms between interstitial cells of Cajal.

Coupling between ICC and smooth muscle cells is uncertain. Gap junctions have been demonstrated in rare circumstances as one coupling mechanism between ICC and smooth muscle cells. Another potential coupling mechanism is the "Peg and Socket" theory which demonstrates that the membranes of smooth muscle cells have the ability either form physical narrow "sockets" or "pegs" to lock onto other smooth muscle cells and/or interstitial cells of Cajal.

== Types ==
A depiction of a slow wave, contraction and electrical threshold in relation to smooth muscle tone and resting membrane potential.

Gastric slow waves occur at around 3 cycles-per-minute in humans and exhibit significance variances in both amplitudes and propagation velocities in the stomach due to the existence of a gradient of resting membrane potential gradient, interstitial cells of Cajal distributions, and gastric wall thickness. Gastric slow wave frequency, propagation velocity, and amplitude demonstrate significant inter-species differences. Extracellular bioelectrical recording studies have demonstrated that gastric slow waves originate from a pacemaker region located on the greater curvature of the stomach. Human gastric slow waves propagate slower in the corpus than in the pacemaker region and antrum of the stomach. Up to four simultaneous slow wave wavefronts can occur in the human stomach.

Intestinal slow waves occur at around 12 cycles-per-minute in the duodenum, and decreases in frequency towards the colon. Entrainment of intestinal slow waves forms "frequency plateaus" in a piece-wise manner along the intestine. Similar to the stomach, intestinal slow waves frequency, propagation velocity, and amplitude also demonstrate significant inter-species differences.

In uterine smooth muscle, slow waves have not been consistently observed. Uterine muscle seems to generate action potentials spontaneously.

In gastrointestinal smooth muscle, the slow-wave threshold can be altered by input from endogenous and exogenous innervation, as well as excitatory (acetylcholine and Substance P) and inhibitory (vasoactive intestinal peptide and nitric oxide) compounds.
