= Interstitial cell of Cajal =

Interstitial cells found in the gastrointestinal tract

Details

Identifiers
- Latin: cellula interstitialis stimulans
- MeSH: D056885
- FMA: 86573

Interstitial cells of Cajal (ICC) are interstitial cells embedded in the muscularis propria (muscular layer) of the gastrointestinal tract. There are different types of ICC with different functions. ICC and another type of interstitial cell, known as platelet-derived growth factor receptor alpha (PDGFRα) cells, are electrically coupled to smooth muscle cells via gap junctions, that work together as an SIP functional syncytium. Myenteric interstitial cells of Cajal (ICC-MY) serve as pacemaker cells that generate the bioelectrical events known as slow waves. Slow waves conduct to smooth muscle cells and cause phasic contractions.

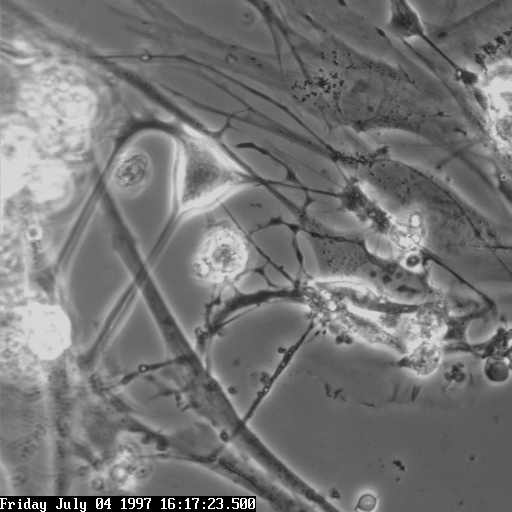
An isolated interstitial cell of Cajal from the myenteric plexus of the mouse small intestine grown in a primary cell culture.

The picture to the right shows an isolated interstitial cell of Cajal from the myenteric plexus of the mouse small intestine grown in a primary cell culture. This cell type can be characterized morphologically as having a small cell body often triangular or stellate-shaped with several long processes branching out into secondary and tertiary extensions - these processes often contact smooth muscle cells. They have contractile behaviour in both the cell body and the extended processes.

== Embryology ==
These cells are derived from mesoderm, unlike the enteric neurons that arise from neural crest cells (ie, ectoderm).

== Function ==
Intramuscular interstitial cells of Cajal (ICC-IM) are involved in mediating responses to neurotransmission. All ICC in the gastrointestinal tract express calcium-activated chloride channels encoded by the gene ANO1. These channels are activated by release of calcium in ICC and are important for both the pacemaker activity of ICC and their responses to neurotransmitters. A recent review noted that carbachol increases ICC activity through this channel. ANO1-knockout mice fail to produce slow waves and ANO1 channel inhibitors block slow waves.

ICC are also thought to be present in other types of smooth muscle tissues. But with few exceptions the function of these cells is not well understood and currently an area of active research.

=== Role in slow wave activity ===
ICC serve as electrical pacemakers and generate spontaneous electrical slow waves in the gastrointestinal (GI) tract. Electrical slow waves spread from ICC to smooth muscle cells and the resulting depolarization initiates calcium ion entry and contraction. Slow waves organize gut contractions into phasic contractions that are the basis for peristalsis and segmentation.

=== Frequency of ICC pacemaker cells ===
The frequency of ICC pacemaker activity differs in different regions of the GI tract:

- 3 per minute in the stomach
- 12 per minute in the duodenum
- 9 per minute in the ileum
- 3 per minute in the colon

ICC also mediate neural input from enteric motor neurons. Animals lacking ICC have greatly reduced responses to the neurotransmitter acetylcholine, released from excitatory motor neurons, and to the transmitter nitric oxide, released from inhibitory motor neurons. Loss of ICC in disease, therefore, may interrupt normal neural control of gastrointestinal (GI) contractions and lead to functional GI disorders, such as irritable bowel syndrome.

ICC also express mechano-sensitive mechanisms that cause these cells to respond to stretch. Stretching GI muscles can affect the resting potentials of ICC and affect the frequency of pacemaker activity. Carbachol increases ICC activity through ANO1 activation.

ICC are also critical in the propagation of electrical slow waves. ICC form a network through which slow wave activity can propagate. If this network is broken, then 2 regions of muscle will function independently.

== Pathology ==
ICCs are thought to be the cells from which gastrointestinal stromal tumours (GISTs) arise. Also, abnormalities in the ICC network is one cause of chronic intestinal pseudo-obstruction.

== Eponym ==
The interstitial cells of Cajal are named after Santiago Ramón y Cajal, a Spanish pathologist and Nobel laureate.

== See also ==
- List of human cell types derived from the germ layers
- Telocyte, a similar, and potentially equivalent, cell
