= List of interstitial cells =

Interstitial cell refers to any cell that lies in the spaces between the functional cells of a tissue.

Examples include:

- Interstitial cell of Cajal (ICC)
- Leydig cells, cells present in the male testes responsible for the production of androgen (male sex hormone)
- A portion of the stroma of ovary
- Certain cells in the pineal gland
- Renal interstitial cells
- Neuroglial cells

== See also ==
- List of human cell types derived from the germ layers
