= Bing Li (academic) =

American immunologist

- Occupations: Immunologist, researcher and academic

Academic background
- Education: Ph.D. in Immunology
- Alma mater: Jiangsu University School of Medicine; Southeast University School of Medicine; Peking University Health Science Center

Bing Li is an immunologist, researcher, and academic. He is an endowed professor for Cancer Immunology, a professor of Pathology at the University of Iowa, and the director of Iowa Cancer and Obesity Initiative. He is also the founder of BMImmune Inc.

Li's research has focused on how FABP4 and FABP5 regulate metabolism and signaling in leukocytes. His work has linked FABPs to diseases like obesity, chronic inflammation, and cancer risk and development, while also identifying clinical applications through targeted FABP activity modification.

Li has been appointed as the University Scholar by the University of Louisville, Endowed Professor in Cancer Immunology Research by the University of Iowa and was featured as a Spotlight Investigator by Nutrition Frontiers, a publication of the Nutritional Science Research Group (NSRG), NCI, NIH. He serves as the guest editor of Tumor Microenvironment for the journal Cancers, and has been an Editorial Board Member for the Journal of Allergy, and BMC Immunology.

== Education and early career ==
In 1994, Li graduated from Jiangsu University School of Medicine and went on to serve as a research assistant there. In 2001, he completed his M.S. in immunology from Southeast University School of Medicine and earned a Ph.D. in immunology from Peking University Health Science Center in 2004. Subsequently, he was appointed as a Postdoctoral Associate at the University of Louisville, followed by a postdoctoral fellow position in the Department of Microbiology and Immunology at the same university from 2007 to 2010.

== Career ==
Li was appointed as an assistant professor at the Hormel Institute, University of Minnesota in 2011. In 2016, he was appointed as an associate professor in the Department of Microbiology and Immunology at the University of Louisville. Since 2021, he has been serving as a professor of pathology, and an endowed professor in cancer immunology at the Department of Pathology of the University of Iowa.

Li has been appointed as the director of Iowa Cancer and Obesity Initiative at the University of Iowa and serves as a steering committee member of the NCI MeDOC Consortium and Nutritional Group Chair for NCI MeDOC Consortium Program at NIH/NCI.

== Research ==
Li has conducted research on the role of fatty acid binding proteins (FABPs), particularly FABP4 and FABP5, in chronic inflammation, obesity, cancer development, and their influence on immune cell functions relevant to obesity-related diseases. In 2020, he presented a SnapShot outlining FABPs' functions, which was published in the cell biology journal Cell.

=== Role of FABP4 in linking obesity-associated cancer risk and progression ===
Li's research primarily explores the functions of Fatty Acid-Binding Proteins (FABPs) in obesity, chronic inflammation, and cancer development, with a specific focus on the complex relationship between obesity and 13 different types of cancers and the unexplored molecular mechanisms underlying these associations. His research indicates FABP4, also known as adipose FABP(A-FABP), as a new player linking obesity-increased risk of breast cancer and possibly other cancers. More specifically, he did research on how FABP4 drives obesity-associated cancer risk through several main mechanisms. While conducting a study on circulating FABP4 which are traditionally thought to be an intracellular protein facilitating fatty acid transport and storage, he showed that obesity increases FABP4 secretion from the adipose tissue. Furthermore, he demonstrated how elevated circulating FABP4 directly binds to cancer cells, promoting the expression of aldehyde dehydrogenase 1 (ALDH1), a hallmark of breast cancer stem cells. Thus, circulating FABP4 mediates cancer risk and progression by enhancing cancer stemness. Subsequently, his research on Intracellular FABP4 investigated how FABP4 besides being expressed in adipocytes are highly expressed in certain subsets of macrophages which are very heterogeneous in tumor stroma, some with antitumor activity while others exhibit the opposite effect. He demonstrated that FABP4 is highly expressed in a subset of tumor associated macrophages (TAMs) with the phenotype of CD11b+F4/80+MHCII−Ly6C−CD11c− and showed that FABP4-positive TAM subset accumulates in the stroma of mammary tumors, which promote tumor growth through enhancing oncogenic IL-6 signaling. In addition, he highlighted how FABP4 also promotes cancer risk through other mechanisms, including providing energy for rapid tumor growth through exergonic free fatty acid transport, enhancing new blood vessel formation, and inhibiting tumor suppressor genes. Collectively, his seminar studies uncovered that FABP4 strengthens interactions among tumor stromal macrophages, adipocytes, and tumor cells and connects obesity-associated adipokines to tumor-promoting signaling, thus representing a mechanism by which obesity increases the risk and development of breast cancer and potentially other types of obesity-associated cancers.

=== Role of FABP5 in chronic inflammation, immune cell lipid metabolism and functional regulation ===
Li's research demonstrated that FABP5 also known as epidermal FABP (E-FABP) due to its high expression in skin epidermis is expressed in certain immune cell subsets, including macrophages and T cells, regulating immune cell lipid metabolism and function in different chronic inflammatory diseases. While acknowledging that under non-obese homeostatic status, FABP5 functions to maintain energy balance and normal cell function, he studied the impact of FABP5 on innate immunity and uncovered that FABP5 expression in macrophages promotes type I IFN-β production, aiding antitumor cell recruitment and protection against tumor growth. While researching the role of FABP5 in chronic inflammation and immune dysfunction triggered by excessive lipid intake, he induced an obese mouse model using different types of HFDs. Moreover, his studies have reported that various dietary fats exert distinct immunoregulatory effects. For instance, mice that are fed a lard-based high-fat diet showed increased dermatitis attributing to saturated lipids in the diet, which induce skin macrophages to produce the pro-inflammatory cytokine IL-1β in a manner dependent on FABP5. In subsequent research, he investigated how mice consuming fish oil-based HFD exhibit enhanced FABP5/ROS/IL-36/TNFα signaling in skin macrophages, leading to impaired hair follicles and hair loss. Furthermore, while studying the role of FABP5 in regulating T cell metabolism and function. He demonstrated an obese mouse model induced by safflower-based HFD, linoleic acids (LA) rich in the safflower oil impairs T cell survival and anti-tumor function highlighting how FABP5 plays a critical role in mediating LA uptake and mitochondrial ROS production in T cells. The result of the research showed that obese mice developed bigger mammary tumor than low fat diet-fed lean mice.

Besides dissecting the role of FABP5 in immunoregulation, Li's group also determined the role of FABP5 in skin pathology by focusing on its role in keratinocytes. His research brought to light the pivotal role played by FABP5 in averting chemical-induced skin tumor development. By orchestrating the IFN/p53/SOX2 pathway in keratinocytes, FABP5 emerges as a promising candidate for augmenting skin's innate immunity, hinting at future therapeutic implications. In addition, his investigation unveiled a new role of FABP5 by mediating keratinocyte/immune cell crosstalk in skin tissue. His research shed light on the widespread use of depilatory creams for the removal of unwanted body hair investigating why the unknown reason for individuals with sensitive skin experiencing depilatory-induced skin burns and inflammation more than others. He looked into FABP5's role in inciting skin inflammation triggered by depilatory procedures, revealing its role as a key molecular trigger for hypersensitive skin reactions.

=== Immunotherapy and tumor antigen identification in cancer ===
Given the important role of FABPs in regulating cell lipid metabolism in obesity, chronic inflammation and cancer development, Li foundered the startup company BMImmune, trying to screen neutralizing antibodies and specific small molecular regulators in modification of FABP activities for potential clinical immunotherapy. His early studies demonstrated that the immunomodulatory agent β-glucan enhances anti-tumor therapeutic efficacy when combined with anti-tumor antibodies in different animal models. Furthermore, his findings have contributed to the FDA's approval for clinical phase II/III trials using yeast-derived β-glucan with anti-vascular epithelial growth factor mAb Avastin and anti-epidermal growth factor receptor mAb cetuximab for treatment of human lung cancer and metastatic colorectal cancer, respectively.

Another aspect of prominence in Li's research is his focus on identifying an immunotherapeutic Cytotoxic T lymphocyte (CTL) epitope in hepatocellular carcinoma (HCC)-associated antigen HCA587 and its potential therapeutic strategies. His 2005 collaborative work identified a new CTL epitope, FLAKLNNTV, with potential for immunotherapies in HCC patients, and assessed HCA587 as an immunotherapy target for HCC. Additionally, recombinant HCA587 protein was expressed and purified using the Bac-to-Bac system, facilitating future investigations into antibody generation and immune responses in HCC. His research work also determined that there seems to be a correlation between the tumor differentiation of HCC and the expression of HCA587 protein, with a higher percentage of protein expression observed in poorly differentiated HCCs.

== Awards and honors ==
- 2018 – Selected "Spotlight Investigator" by Nutrition Frontiers, Nutrition Science Research Group, NIH/NCI
- 2019 – University of Scholar, University of Louisville
- 2021 – Endowed Professor in Cancer Immunology Research, University of Iowa

== Selected articles ==
- Hao J, Jin R, Zeng J, Hua Y, Yorek MS, Liu L, Mandal A, Li J, Zheng H, Sun Y, Yi Y, Yin D, Zheng Q, Li x, Ng CK, Rouchka EC, Egilmez NK, Jabbari A, Li B. hang YW, Sun Y, Rao E, Yan F, Li Q, Zhang Y, Silverstein KA, Liu S, Sauter E, Cleary MP, Li B. Consumption of fish oil high-fat diet induces murine hair loss via epidermal fatty acid binding protein in skin macrophages. Cell Reports. 2022 Dec 13;41(11):111804.
- Jin R, Hao J, Yi Y, Yin D, Hua Y, Li X, Bao H, Han X, Egilmez NK, Sauter ER, Li B. Dietary fats high in linoleic acids impair anti-tumor T cell responses by inducing E-FABP-mediated mitochondrial dysfunction. Cancer Research, 2021; Aug, 16; DOI: 10.1158/0008-5472.CAN-21-0757
- Li B, Hao J, Zeng J, Sauter ER. Snapshot: FABP functions. Cell, 2020;182(4)1066-1067
- Hao J, Zhang Y, Yan XF, Yan F, Sun Y, Zeng J, Waigel S, Yin Y, Fraig MM, Egilmez NK, Suttles J, Kong M, Liu S, Cleary MP, Sauter E, Li B. Circulating Adipose Fatty Acid Binding Protein Promotes Obesity-Associated Breast/Mammary Tumor Development. Cell Metabolism, 2018, 28(5):689-705.
- Hao J, Yan F, Zhang Y, Triplett A, Zhang Y, Schultz DA, Sun Y, Zeng J, Silverstein KAT, Zheng Q, Bernlohr DA, Cleary MP, Egilmez NK, Sauter E, Liu S, Suttles J, Li B. Expression of adipocyte/macrophage fatty acid binding protein in tumor associated macrophages promotes breast cancer progression. Cancer Research, 2018, 78(9):2343-2355
- Zhang YW, Li Q, Rao EY, Sun Y, Grossmann ME, Morris RJ, Cleary MP, Li B. Epidermal Fatty Acid Binding Protein Promotes Skin Inflammation Induced by High-Fat Diet. Immunity, 2015; 42(5):953-964.
