= Epithelial cell adhesion molecule =

Transmembrane glycoprotein

EPCAM

Identifiers
- Aliases: EPCAM, DIAR5, EGP-2, EGP314, EGP40, ESA, HNPCC8, KS1/4, KSA, M4S1, MIC18, MK-1, TACSTD1, TROP1, epithelial cell adhesion molecule, BerEp4, MOC-31, Ber-Ep4
- External IDs: OMIM: 185535; MGI: 106653; GeneCards: EPCAM
Available structures
PDB	Ortholog search: PDBe RCSB
PDB	List of PDB id codes 4MZV

Gene location (Human)
Chr.	Chromosome 2 (human)
Band	2p21	Start	47,345,158 bp
Band	2p21	End	47,387,601 bp

Gene location (Mouse)
Chr.	Chromosome 17 (mouse)
Band	17|17 E4	Start	87,943,407 bp
Band	17|17 E4	End	87,958,557 bp
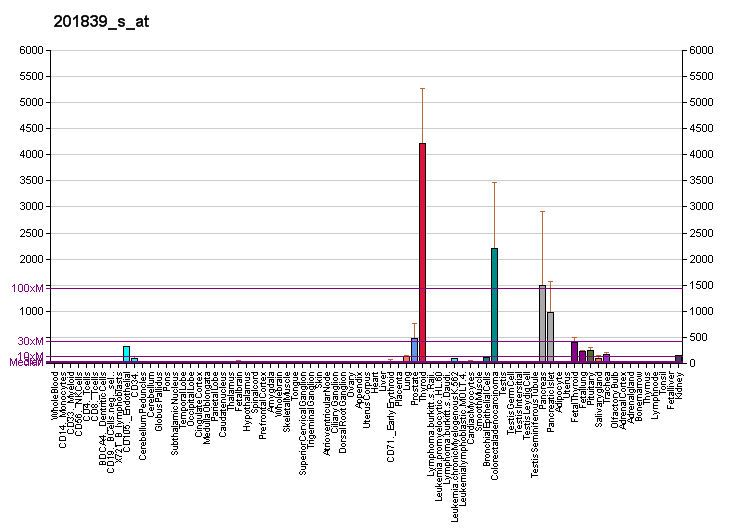
RNA expression pattern
Bgee	Human / Mouse (ortholog); Top expressed in: jejunal mucosa; mucosa of colon; mucosa of sigmoid colon; rectum; duodenum; mucosa of transverse colon; renal medulla; corpus epididymis; islet of Langerhans; bronchial epithelial cell / Top expressed in: left colon; ileum; migratory enteric neural crest cell; crypt of lieberkuhn of small intestine; epithelium of small intestine; intestinal villus; duodenum; vestibular sensory epithelium; utricle; medullary collecting duct; More reference expression data
BioGPS	More reference expression data
Gene ontology
Molecular function	protein-containing complex binding; protein binding; cadherin binding involved in cell-cell adhesion
Cellular component	integral component of membrane; lateral plasma membrane; membrane; bicellular tight junction; plasma membrane; cell surface; cell junction; basolateral plasma membrane; apical plasma membrane; extracellular exosome; integral component of plasma membrane
Biological process	ureteric bud development; positive regulation of cell motility; negative regulation of cell-cell adhesion mediated by cadherin; signal transduction involved in regulation of gene expression; negative regulation of apoptotic process; stem cell differentiation; positive regulation of cell population proliferation; positive regulation of stem cell proliferation; positive regulation of transcription by RNA polymerase II; leukocyte migration; cell-cell adhesion via plasma-membrane adhesion molecules
Sources:Amigo / QuickGO
Orthologs
Databases	NCBI: entry; OMA: entry
Species	Human	Mouse
Entrez	4072	17075
Ensembl	ENSG00000119888	ENSMUSG00000045394
UniProt	P16422	Q99JW5
RefSeq (mRNA)	NM_002354	NM_008532
RefSeq (protein)	NP_002345	NP_032558
Location (UCSC)	Chr 2: 47.35 – 47.39 Mb	Chr 17: 87.94 – 87.96 Mb
PubMed search
- Wikidata
View/Edit Human	View/Edit Mouse

Epithelial cell adhesion molecule (EpCAM), also known as CD326 among other names, is a protein which in humans is encoded by the gene EPCAM. EpCAM is a transmembrane glycoprotein mediating Ca^{2+}-independent homotypic cell–cell adhesion in epithelia. EpCAM is also involved in cell signaling, migration, proliferation, and differentiation. Additionally, EpCAM has oncogenic potential via its capacity to upregulate MYC, FABP5, and cyclins A & E. Since EpCAM is expressed exclusively in epithelia and epithelial-derived neoplasms, EpCAM can be used as diagnostic marker for various cancers. It appears to play a role in tumorigenesis and metastasis of carcinomas, so it can also act as a potential prognostic marker and as a potential target for immunotherapeutic strategies.

== Expression pattern ==
First discovered in 1979, EpCAM was initially described as a dominant surface antigen on human colon carcinoma. Because of its prevalence on many carcinomas, it has been "discovered" many different times. EpCAM therefore has many aliases the most notable of which include TACSTD1 (tumor-associated calcium signal transducer 1), CD326 (cluster of differentiation 326), and the 17-1A antigen.

EpCAM expression is not limited to human colon carcinomas; in fact, EpCAM is expressed in a variety of human epithelial tissues, carcinomas, and progenitor and stem cells. However, EpCAM is not found in non-epithelial cells or cancers of non-epithelial origin. EpCAM is expressed on the basolateral membrane of all simple (especially glandular), pseudo-stratified, and transitional epithelia. In contrast, normal squamous stratified epithelia are negative for EpCAM. The level of expression may differ significantly between the individual tissue types. In the gastrointestinal tract, the gastric epithelium expresses very low levels of EpCAM. Expression levels are substantially higher in small intestine, and in colon EpCAM is probably expressed at the highest levels among all epithelial cell types.

EpCAM is frequently upregulated in carcinomas but is not expressed in cancers of non-epithelial origin. In cancer cells, EpCAM is expressed in a dispersed pattern across the cell membrane. However, EpCAM expression in carcinomas is often heterogeneous; some cells in a tumor have more EpCAM than other cells in the same tumor.

Squamous carcinomas often express EpCAM whereas normal squamous cells do not express EpCAM. EpCAM expression differs between different types of renal cell carcinomas, and EpCAM expression increases during development of androgen resistance in prostate cancer. All of this points towards the utility of EpCAM as a diagnostic tool for various cancers.

== Structure ==
Although it is identified as a cell adhesion molecule, EpCAM does not structurally resemble any of the four major families of cell adhesion molecules, namely cadherins, integrins, selectins, and members of the immunoglobulin super-family.

EpCAM is a glycosylated, 30- to 40-kDa type I membrane protein. The sequence of the EpCAM molecule predicts the presence of three potential N-linked glycosylation sites. It is composed of 314 amino acids. EpCAM consists of an extracellular domain (242 amino acids) with epidermal growth factor (EGF)- and thyroglobulin repeat-like domains, a single transmembrane domain (23 amino acids), and a short intracellular domain (26 amino acids). The extracellular domain is sometimes referred to as EpEX, and the intracellular domain is sometimes referred to as EpICD.

== Function ==
The exact function of EpCAM is currently being elucidated, but EpCAM appears to play many different roles.

=== Cell adhesion ===
EpCAM was first found to play a role in homotypic cell adhesion. This means that EpCAM on the surface of one cell binds to the EpCAM on a neighboring cell thereby holding the cells together. The adhesions mediated by EpCAM are relatively weak, as compared to some other adhesion molecules, such as classic cadherins.

EpICD is required for EpCAM to mediate intercellular adhesion; EpCAM mediates intercellular adhesion and associates with the actin cytoskeleton via EpICD.

EpCAM has a negative impact on cadherin-mediated adhesions. Overexpression of EpCAM does not alter overall total cellular level of cadherins but rather decreases the association of the cadherin/catenin complex in the cytoskeleton. As EpCAM expression increases, the total amount of α-catenin decreases, whereas cellular β-catenin levels remain constant.

The homotypic adhesive activity has been questioned, as a variety of in vivo and in vitro biochemical experiments have failed to detect trans-interactions. EpCAM pro-adhesive activity could be explained by alternative models, based on its ability to regulate PKC signalling and myosin activity.

Recently, it has been discovered that EpCAM contributes to the maintenance of tight junctions.

Active proliferation in a number of epithelial tissues is associated with increased or de novo EpCAM expression. This is especially evident in tissues that normally reveal no or low levels of EpCAM expression, such as squamous epithelium. The level of EpCAM expression correlates with the proliferative activity of intestinal cells, and inversely correlates with their differentiation.

=== Role in cancer ===
EpCAM can be cleaved which lends the molecule oncogenic potential. Upon cleavage, the extracellular domain (EpEX) is released into the area surrounding the cell, and the intracellular domain (EpICD) is released into the cytoplasm of the cell. EpICD forms a complex with the proteins FHL2, β-catenin, and Lef inside the nucleus. This complex then binds to DNA and promotes the transcription of various genes. Targets of upregulation include MYC, FABP5, and cyclins A & E. This has the effect of promoting tumor growth. Additionally, EpEX that has been cleaved can stimulate the cleavage of additional EpCAM molecules resulting in a positive feedback loop. The amount of β-catenin in the nucleus can modulate the expression level of EpCAM.

EpCAM may also play a role in epithelial mesenchymal transition (EMT) in tumors, although its exact effects are poorly understood. Its ability to suppress E-cadherin suggests that EpCAM would promote EMT and tumor metastasis, but its homotypic cell adhesion properties can counteract its ability to suppress E-cadherin. Results from different studies are often conflicting. In one study, for example, silencing of EpCAM with short interfering RNA (siRNA) led to a reduction of proliferation, migration, and invasion of breast cancer cells in vitro supporting the role of EpCAM in promoting EMT. In another study, cells undergoing EMT were found to downregulate EpCAM. In one study, epithelial tumors were often strongly positive for EpCAM, but mesenchymal tumors showed only occasional and weak positivity. It has been suggested that EpCAM expression is downregulated during EMT but then upregulated once the metastasis reaches its future tumor site.

== Clinical significance ==
=== Target for immunotherapy ===
It has been speculated that since EpCAM in normal epithelia is expressed mostly on the basolateral membrane, it would be much less accessible to antibodies than EpCAM in cancer tissue, where it is homogeneously distributed on the cancer cell surface. In addition to being overexpressed in many carcinomas, EpCAM is expressed in cancer stem cells, making EpCAM an attractive target for immunotherapy. However, the heterogeneous expression of EpCAM in carcinomas and the fact that EpCAM is not tumor-specific (i.e., it is found in normal epithelium) raise concerns that immunotherapy directed towards EpCAM could have severe side effects. As the role of EpCAM in cancer cell signaling is better understood, EpCAM signaling rather than EpCAM itself may be a target for therapeutic intervention.

Edrecolomab, catumaxomab, nofetumomab and other monoclonal antibodies are designed to bind to it.

=== Histopathology ===
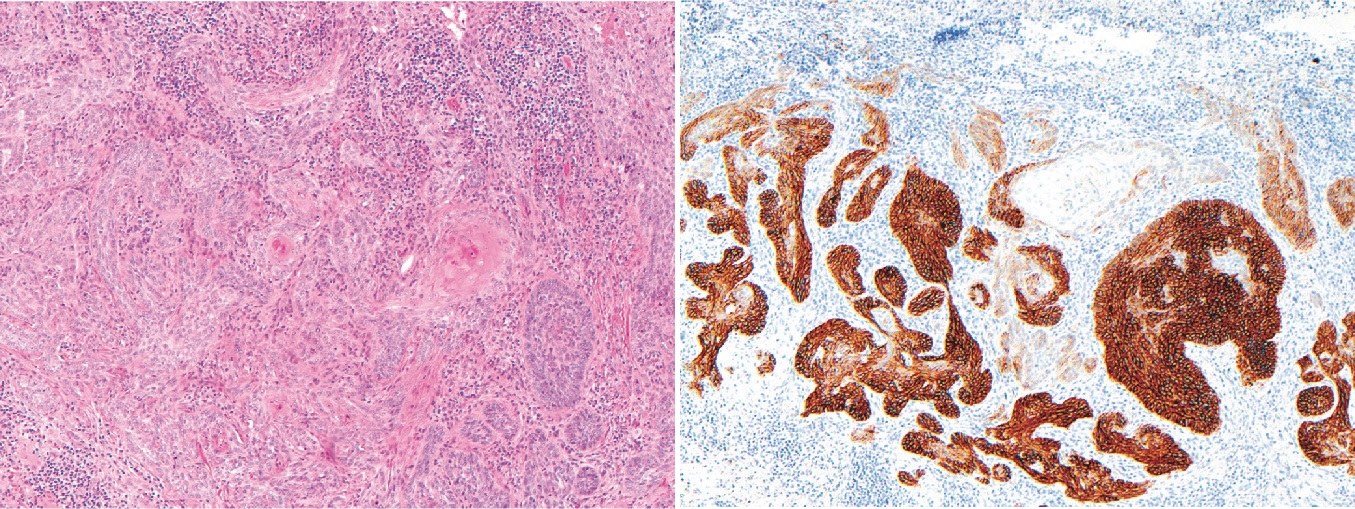
Comparison H&E stain (left) with BerEP4 immunohistochemistry staining (right) on a pathological section having basal cell carcinoma (BCC) with squamous cell metaplasia. Only BCC cells are stained with BerEP4 in this image.

EpCAM is often overexpressed in certain carcinomas, including in breast cancer, colon cancer and basal cell carcinoma of the skin. The diagnosis of such conditions can therefore be assisted by immunohistochemistry using BerEp4, which is an antibody to EpCAM.

=== Genetic disorders ===
A problem in EpCAM can indirectly cause Lynch syndrome, a genetic disorder that leads to increased risk of cancer. Deletion of a portion of the 3' end of the EpCAM gene causes epigenetic inactivation of the MSH2 gene by hypermethylating the promoter region of the MSH2 gene.

Mutations in EpCAM have also been associated with congenital tufting enteropathy which causes intractable diarrhea in newborn children.
