= Gökhan S. Hotamisligil =

American geneticist

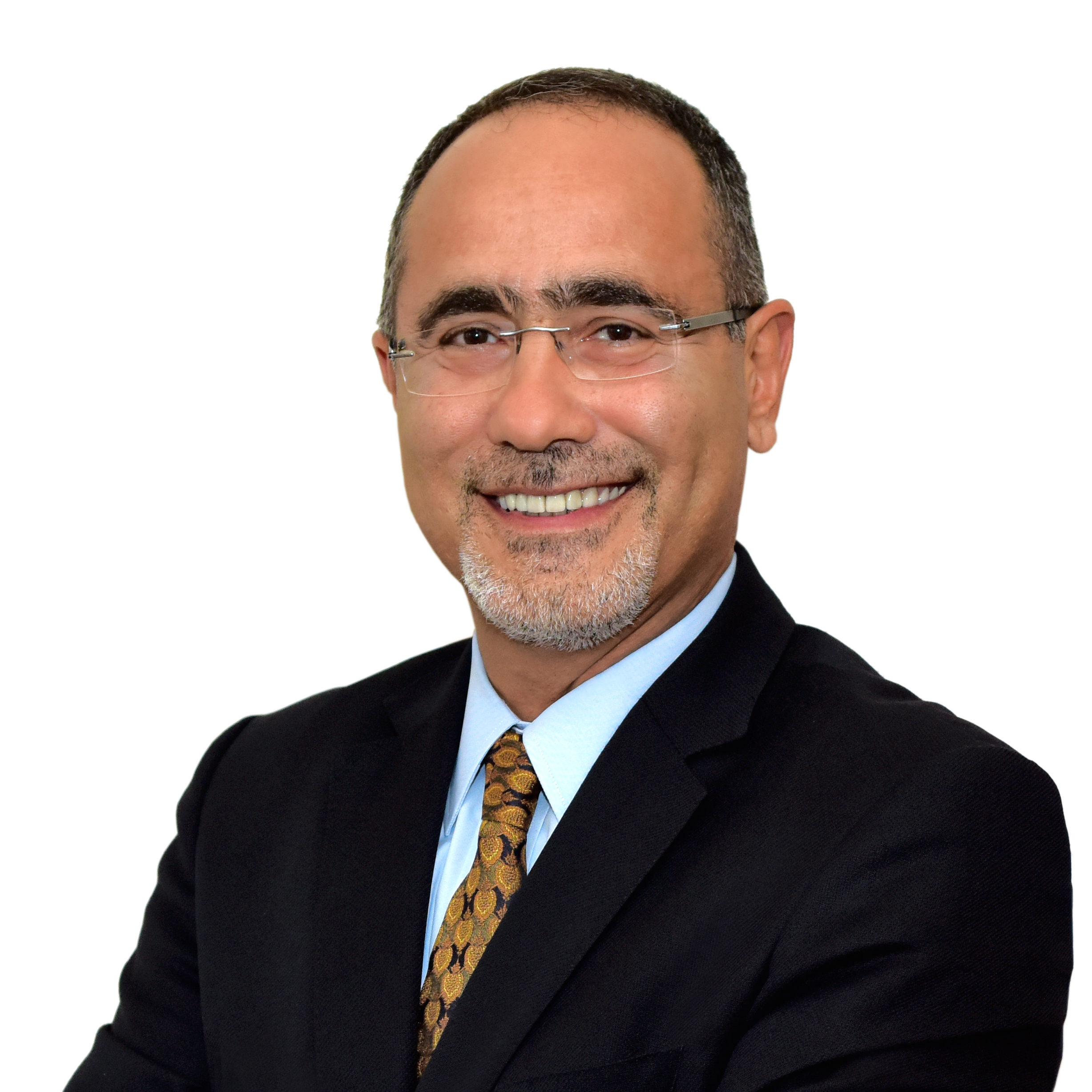
- Born: Rize, Turkey
- Citizenship: Turkey and US
- Education: Ankara University (MD, 1986); Harvard University (PhD, 1994)
- Spouse: Selen Ciliv Hotamisligil
- Children: 2
- Scientific career
- Fields: Metabolism, obesity, diabetes, atherosclerosis
- Workplaces: Harvard University, Harvard T.H. Chan School of Public Health

Gökhan S. Hotamisligil (Turkish: Gökhan Sıddık Hotamışlıgil;) is a Turkish-American physician scientist; James Stevens Simmons Professor of Genetics and Metabolism at Harvard T.H. Chan School of Public Health (HSPH); Director of the Harvard Chan Center on Causes and Prevention of Cardiovascular Disease (CAP-CVD), associate member of Harvard-MIT Broad Institute, Harvard Stem Cell Institute and the Joslin Diabetes Center.

Hotamisligil has been a pioneer in research efforts to explain the mechanistic basis of common chronic metabolic diseases; particularly obesity, diabetes, fatty liver disease, and atherosclerosis. His work has led to the emergence of novel concepts that have altered the understanding of metabolic disease pathogenesis.

== Biography ==
Gökhan Hotamisligil was born in Rize, Turkey and after attending elementary schools in Vakfikebir, Turgutlu, and Gediz; he graduated from the public Ankara Atatürk Anadolu High School in 1980. He then received his degree in medicine from Ankara University Medical School in 1986 and his PhD from Harvard Medical School (HMS) in 1994. Hotamisligil joined the Harvard T.H. Chan School of Public Health (HSPH) as an assistant professor in the Department of Nutrition & Division of Biological Sciences. He was promoted to tenured professor in 2003. He founded the Department of Genetics & Complex Diseases in the same year and served as the chair of the department for 16 years. From 2014 to 2024, the Sabri Ülker Center for Nutrient, Genetic, and Metabolic Research at HSPH was established by the Ülker family to support the research in the laboratory of Hotamisligil. In 2025, the Hotamisligil laboratory signed into agreement a strategic alliance with Harvard's Office of Technology Development and İş Private Equity to form Enlila, a biotech venture whose aim is to translate the groundbreaking research from the Hotamişlıgil Laboratory into therapeutics for obesity, cardiovascular, and age-related diseases.

Hotamisligil has been recognized with many fellowships and awards over the course of his career. These include election as a fellow of the American Association for the Advancement of Science, election as Pew Scholar in Biomedical Sciences, the Lucille P. Markey Predoctoral Fellowship in Developmental Biology, the Naomi Berrie Award for Outstanding Achievement in Diabetes Research, the Outstanding Scientific Accomplishment Award from the American Diabetes Association, the Wertheimer Award for Outstanding Basic Research Contributions in the field of obesity from IASO, the Danone International Prize for Nutrition, the Roy Greep Award for Outstanding Research from the Endocrine Society, EASD–Novo Nordisk Foundation Diabetes Prize for Excellence, among others. In 2026, he was elected to the United States National Academy of Sciences, considered to be one of the most prestigious societies among scientists. In addition, Hotamisligil has served and continues to serve in many editorial boards including Science Translational Medicine, Cell Metabolism, EMBO molecular Medicine, Journal of Clinical Investigation, PlosBiology, and others.

Hotamisligil has many philantrophic and service-related activities abroad. He was featured as an exhibitor for his project "Molecular Architecture" in a joint exhibit with Refik Anadol Studios at Venice Biennale in 2024. He has also been the recipient of 2004 TUBITAK Science Award, Koç Science Award and elected member of the Turkish Academy of Sciences. He also serves as a member of the board of trustees of Kadir Has University.

== Research ==
Hotamisligil's research efforts focus on the molecular and genetic basis of common and complex diseases, particularly those associated with obesity and aging including diabetes, carvdiovascular disease, fatty liver disease, and asthma. His research examines the mechanisms of nutrient sensing and response pathways as they relate to immune and metabolic homeostasis. Hotamisligil's work has been instrumental in the emergence of the immunological basis of obesity and diabetes and the field of immunometabolism^{,}^{,}. Today obesity and diabetes are understood as states of chronic, low-grade, sustained, systemic and metabolically orchestrated inflammation; also known as “metaflammation,” a concept introduced by Hotamisligil; which underlies the pathogenesis of metabolic diseases.

In a 1997 paper, Hotamışlıgil lab published a study showing that genetic ablation of an inflammatory mediator or its receptor in obese mice resulted in the improvement of insulin sensitivity and glucose metabolism. This study provided definitive proof that metaflammation was a critical component of chronic metabolic diseases.

In a 2002 paper, the Hotamisligil lab established a link between activation of the inflammatory and stress kinase JNK and consequent inhibition of insulin receptor signaling via phosphorylation of the insulin receptor substrate (IRS-1). Since then, his lab has identified multiple other significant molecules and pathways as key modulators of chronic metabolic inflammation, insulin sensitivity and glucose metabolism in obesity.

The Hotamisligil lab also established the importance of organelle homeostasis in metabolic tissues and the role of organelle dysfunction in metabolic disease. In particular, they established that chronic endoplasmic reticulum (ER) dysfunction is a feature of metabolic tissues in obesity, linked to regulation of insulin action and glucose and lipid metabolism. In subsequent studies they showed that the increase in ER stress in the obese condition is in part related to defects in autophagy, the cellular recycling system, as well as changes in lipid metabolism and ER membrane composition and result in alterations ER calcium homeostasis. Recently, the Hotamisligil lab also delineated abnormal interactions between ER and mitochondria in the context of metabolic disease that result in aberrant calcium metabolism and mitochondrial dysfunction. More recently, Hotamisligil lab performed the most detailed molecular architectural analysis of subcellular structures in hepatocytes, in their native liver tissue environment in lean and obese liver and during feeding and fasting cycles. These pioneering studies demonstrated the structural changes that are caused by obesity and nutritional status and defined a novel mechanism of metabolic homeostasis through molecular architectural regulation

Hotamisligil lab integrates these cellular and molecular stress pathways to nutrients through their work in an integrated field on lipid trafficking and signaling with a focus on fatty acid binding proteins, de novo lipogenesis products, and new hormones. In a 2008 paper, Hotamisligil lab described a lipid natured hormone, which they named as a “lipokine” and showed its beneficial actions on lipid and glucose metabolism. In 2015, Hotamisligil lab described a novel hormone that is produced by the adipose tissue during fasting to regulate hepatic glucose production and pancreatic activity. Therapeutic targeting of both of these molecules is pursued for the treatment of metabolic diseases. In a 2017 paper, Hotamisligil lab has identified a transcription factor, NRF1, that both senses and responds to excess cholesterol in the ER and acts together with SREBP2 as yin-yang to keep ER cholesterol levels within a safe, narrow range. The lab also defined the mechanism of interactions between these two critical pathways controlling cholesterol balance. Additional studies demonstrated that NRF1 is a critical defender of metabolic homeostasis under the most challenging of conditions, such as brown adipose tissue challenged by cold, or the integrity of the cells with the highest secretory demands.

In 2022, Hotamisligil lab described the discovery of a new hormone complex called Fabkin, formed by FABP4-ADK-NDPK proteins and defined its molecular mechanism of action. These studies also demonstrated a remarkable therapeutic activity of targeting this complex in both type 1 and type 2 diabetes. In 2025, research conducted in the Hotamışlıgil lab found that obesity impairs hepatic coenzyme Q (CoQ) synthesis, raising the CoQH₂/CoQ ratio and triggering excessive mitochondrial reactive oxygen species production via reverse electron transport at complex I. Using genetic and pharmacological models and human steatosis samples, the study identifies this CoQ–RET axis as a key, targetable mechanism linking disrupted mitochondrial redox signaling to impaired glucose homeostasis and fatty liver disease. The lab now pursues innovative collaborative models to realize the translational potential of this target and pursuing paths towards clinical applications

As of 2026, Hotamisligil has authored over 200 publications, which have received in excess of 85,000 citations and was named as an inventor on multiple patents. He has an h-index of 115. Hotamisligil has also been a mentor to many students and fellows who are now pursuing their independent scientific careers in many capacities around the world. He has been an advocate of science as a vehicle of diplomacy between cultures and delivered more than 500 lectures around the world.

== Personal life ==
Hotamisligil is married to Selen Ciliv Hotamisligil, a physician scientist specialized in assisted infertility treatment technologies and clinical applications and a consultant to World Health Organization. His late father Hulki Hotamisligil was a physician and mother Güner Hotamisligil was a teacher who served in remote regions of Turkey to support public health and education.

== Selected lectures ==
2004 Recipient of the Turkish Scientific and Research Council, TUBITAK Award

2007 Outstanding Scientific Accomplishment Award, American Diabetes Association

2009 Elected Fellow of American Association for Advancement of Science

2010 Wertheimer Award, International Association for the Study of Obesity

2010 Naomi Berrie Award for Outstanding Achievement in Diabetes Research

2012 Richard J. Havel Lecture

2013 Koç Foundation Science Award

2014 Danone International Prize for Nutrition

2015 Roy O. Greep Award for Outstanding Research, Endocrine Society

2017 Hans L. Falk Memorial Lecture

2018 EASD–Novo Nordisk Foundation Diabetes Prize for Excellence

2026 Veda R. and Buford L. Nichols Jr. Lectureship, Children's Nutrition Research Center, Baylor College of Medicine

2026 Elected Member, United States National Academy of Sciences
