= Panorex =

Panorex may refer to:

- dental panoramic radiograph
- proposed trade name of the investigational anti-cancer monoclonal antibody edrecolomab
- a former cinema, currently a cultural centre in Nová Dubnica, Slovakia
