= Zhao Yu =

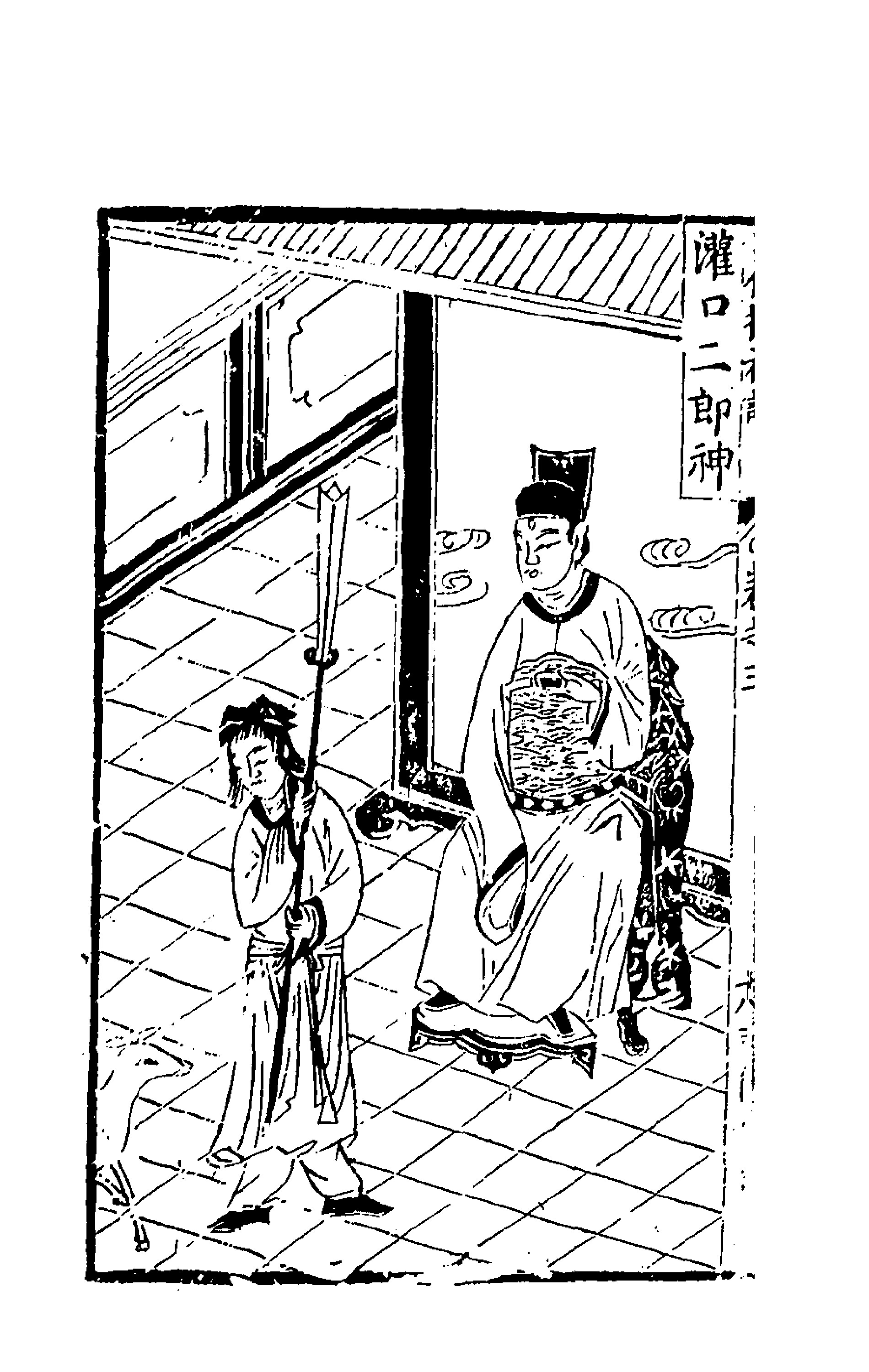
Zhao Yu

Zhao Yu (趙昱; fl. c. late 6th – early 7th century) was a government official of the Sui dynasty in China who later became a deified figure in Chinese folk religion and Taoism. He is one of the most prominent historical figures believed to be the true identity of the popular deity Erlang Shen, particularly the cult of "Erlang of Guankou" (灌口二郎). He is venerated as a god who provides protection and controls floods.

== Life and career ==
According to later accounts, Zhao Yu (趙昱) lived during the Sui dynasty. His courtesy name was Zhongming (仲明). He and his older brother Zhao Mian (趙冕) lived on Mount Qingcheng, where they studied Daoism under a teacher named Li Jue (李珏).

Emperor Yang of Sui heard of Zhao Yu and called him to serve the government. Zhao Yu first refused, but was later brought to the imperial court. The emperor offered him a high-ranking position, which he also refused. Instead, Zhao Yu asked to serve as a local governor in Sichuan. The emperor agreed and made him the governor of Jiazhou, in the area of present-day Leshan, Sichuan.

A local legend says that a flood dragon (蛟) lived in a pool near Qianwei (犍為). The dragon caused floods and sank boats, killing many people. Zhao Yu decided to kill it. He led about 1,000 soldiers and 10,000 local men to the river. The men stood along the banks and shouted while Zhao Yu entered the water with a sword. Soon, the water turned red and a loud noise came from the river. Zhao Yu then came out of the water holding the dragon's head in one hand and his sword in the other. The people believed he had saved them from the floods and treated him as a divine being. The story says he was only twenty-six years old at the time.

When the Sui dynasty began to fall, Zhao Yu left his post and disappeared. No one knew where he went.

== Disappearance and deification ==
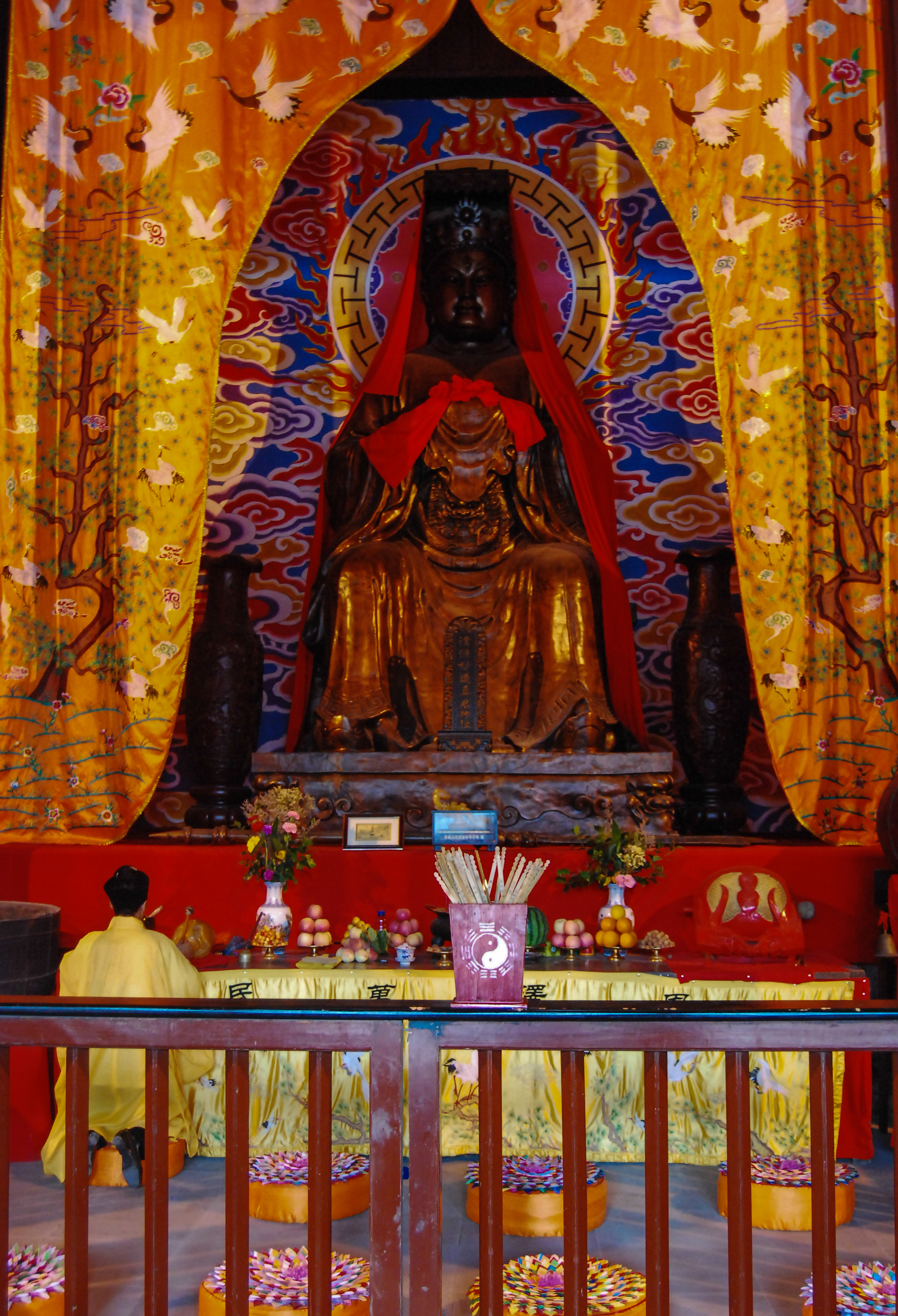
Statue of Erlang Shen inside Erwang Temple in Dujiangyan, Sichuan

According to the Sanjiao Yuanliu Soushen Daquan (三教源流搜神大全), Zhao Yu left his government post during the fall of the Sui dynasty and disappeared. No one knew where he went. Later, when the river near Jiazhou flooded, people said they saw him riding a white horse through the mist above the water. They believed he had become a god and built a temple at Guankou (灌口) to honor him. He was worshipped there as Guankou Erlang (灌口二郎).

Later accounts say that Emperor Taizong of Tang gave Zhao Yu the title "Great General of Divine Valor" (神勇大將軍). During the An Lushan Rebellion, Emperor Xuanzong of Tang fled to Sichuan and gave him the title "King of Chicheng" (赤城王). During the reign of Emperor Zhenzong of Song, the official Zhang Yong prayed at Zhao Yu's temple for help in ending unrest in Sichuan. After peace returned, Zhang asked the emperor to give Zhao Yu another title. He was then honored as "Qingyuan Miaodao Zhenjun" (清源妙道真君; "True Lord of the Wondrous Way of the Pure Source").

Zhao Yu later became one of the figures identified with Erlang Shen, a god who protects people from floods and demons. His story of killing a flood dragon became part of the stories told about Erlang Shen. Other traditions link Erlang Shen to Li Bing and his son, Li Erlang. In later novels, including Investiture of the Gods, Erlang Shen is known as Yang Jian. These different stories became mixed over time, although Zhao Yu continued to be worshipped as Erlang Shen in parts of Sichuan.
