= Congenital tufting enteropathy =

- Specialty: Gastroenterology

Congenital tufting enteropathy is an inherited disorder of the small intestine that presents with intractable diarrhea in young children.

== Signs and symptoms ==
The infants present in the first few days of life with watery diarrhoea. This leads rapidly to dehydration and electrolyte imbalance and metabolic decompensation. Enteral feeding with a protein hydrolysate or amino acid based formulas worsen the diarrhoea and the children rapidly fail to thrive and develop protein energy malnutrition.

In the majority of cases the severity of the malabsorption and diarrhoea make them dependent on daily long term total parenteral nutrition.

Hepatic fibrosis and cirrhosis are known complications.

=== Associated conditions ===
- Choanal atresia
- Nonspecific punctuated keratitis (60%)
- Oesophageal atresia
- Unperforated anus

== Genetics ==
Two genes have been associated with this condition: Epithelial cell adhesion molecule (EpCAM) on chromosome 2 (2p21) and SPINT2 on chromosome 19. SPINT2 is a Kunitz-type protease inhibitor.

The mutation in the EpCAM gene in Kuwait and Qatar appears to have originated 5000–6000 years ago.

== Pathology ==
Histological examination of the small bowel shows varying degrees of villous atrophy, with low or without mononuclear cell infiltration of the lamina propria. The most important feature involves the epithelium where the surface enterocytes are disorganized with focal crowding creating structures resembling tufts.

Other features that have been reported include the abnormal deposition of laminin and heparan sulfate proteoglycan within the basement membrane and increased expression of desmoglein. Electron microscopic changes in the desmosomes have been noted as have abnormal distribution of alpha2beta1 integrin adhesion molecules.

== Diagnosis ==
=== Differential diagnosis ===
- Congenital chloride diarrhoea
- Congenital sodium diarrhoea
- Familial microvillous atrophy
- Glucose-galactose malabsorption

== Management ==
Bowel transplantation may be an option.

== Epidemiology ==
The prevalence of this disorder has been estimated to be 1/50,000-100,000 per live births in Western Europe. It appears to be higher in areas with high degree of consanguinity and in patients of Arabic origin.

== History ==
The first cases appears to have been reported in 1978 by Davidson et al. These authors reported a five cases of intractable diarrhoea four of whom died. Post mortum showed a thin and dilated intestine with flat small bowel mucosa. A number of jejunal biopsies had been taken during life and these showed partial villous atrophy with by crypt hyperplasia and an increased number of mitotic figures in the crypts. Normal numbers and types of mononuclear cells were present in the lamina propria. Most notably focal epithelial tufts were found on the surface epithelium. These tufts were composed of closely packed enterocytes with apical rounding of the plasma membrane, resulting in a teardrop configuration of the cells. Inclusion bodies or secretory granules were not visualised on transmission electron microscopy within the cytoplasm of the villous enterocytes.

Reifen et al reported 2 additional cases in 1994 and coined the name congenital tufting enteropathy.
