= Technetium (99mTc) nofetumomab merpentan =

Mouse monoclonal antibody

Technetium (^{99m}Tc) nofetumomab merpentan

Monoclonal antibody
- Type: Fab fragment
- Source: Mouse

Clinical data
- Trade names: Verluma
- ATC code: none

Pharmacokinetic data
- Elimination half-life: 10.5 hours
- Excretion: renal (64%)

Identifiers
- CAS Number: 165942-79-0
- ChemSpider: none
- UNII: 9UFH75HT7S

Technetium (^{99m}Tc) nofetumomab merpentan (trade name Verluma) is a mouse monoclonal antibody derivative used in the diagnosis of lung cancer, gastrointestinal, breast, ovary, pancreas, kidney, cervix, and bladder carcinoma. The antibody part, nofetumomab, is attached to the chelator merpentan, which links it to the radioisotope technetium-99m (^{99m}Tc).

== Nofetumomab ==
Nofetumomab is an antibody fragment that recognises the pancarcinoma glycoprotein antigen EpCAM. and/or CD20/MS4A1

It is the Fab part of murine MAb NR-LU-10.

== Merpentan ==
The chelator part : merpentan is a phenthioate ligand, 2,3,5,6-tetrafluorophenyl-4,5-bis-5-[1-ethoxyethyl]-thioacetoamidopentanoate.

=== Phenthioate ===
Phenthioate is an insecticide (Cidial) = O,o-dimethyl-S-(carbethoxy-phenylmethyl)dithiophosphate
