= Li Bing =

Li Bing may refer to:

- Li Bing (Qin) (李冰; fl. 3rd century BC), hydraulic engineer and official of the state of Qin
- Li Bing (Northern Zhou) (李昞; died 572), Northern Zhou official
- Li Bing (footballer) (黎兵; born 1969), Chinese footballer and team manager
- Li Bing (handballer) (李兵; born 1980), Chinese handballer
- Li Bing (powerlifter) (born 1974), Chinese Paralympic powerlifter
- Li Bing (writer) (born 1949), Vice-Chairman of the Chinese Writers' Association (CWA).
- Bing Li (academic), immunologist

== See also ==
- Bing Lee, retail chain
- Li Bingbing (李冰冰), actress
