= ART26.12 =

Identifiers
- IUPAC name: (2R,4R)-3-(2,3-dihydro-1H-inden-2-yloxycarbonyl)-2,4-bis(2-methoxyphenyl)cyclobutane-1-carboxylic acid
- CAS Number: 2766800-24-0
- PubChem CID: 163249803
- UNII: AU843Z3Q9K

Chemical and physical data
- Formula: C_{29}H_{28}O_{6}
- Molar mass: 472.537 g·mol^{−1}
- 3D model (JSmol): Interactive image
- SMILES: COC1=CC=CC=C1[C@@H]2C([C@H](C2C(=O)OC3CC4=CC=CC=C4C3)C5=CC=CC=C5OC)C(=O)O
- InChI: InChI=1S/C29H28O6/c1-33-22-13-7-5-11-20(22)24-26(28(30)31)25(21-12-6-8-14-23(21)34-2)27(24)29(32)35-19-15-17-9-3-4-10-18(17)16-19/h3-14,19,24-27H,15-16H2,1-2H3,(H,30,31)/t24-,25-,26?,27?/m1/s1; Key:HFKXLDACQCGGEI-BINWOUKTSA-N

ART26.12 is an experimental drug that acts as a selective inhibitor of the enzyme FABP5, which usually breaks down endocannabinoids such as anandamide. ART26.12 thereby boosts endocannabinoid levels and has analgesic effects, showing efficacy against atypical pain syndromes such as hyperalgesia and allodynia. It is being researched as a potential treatment for neuropathy which can occur as a side effect of some kinds of chemotherapy, as well as showing activity against psoriasis.
