= FABP6 =

Mammalian protein found in Homo sapiens

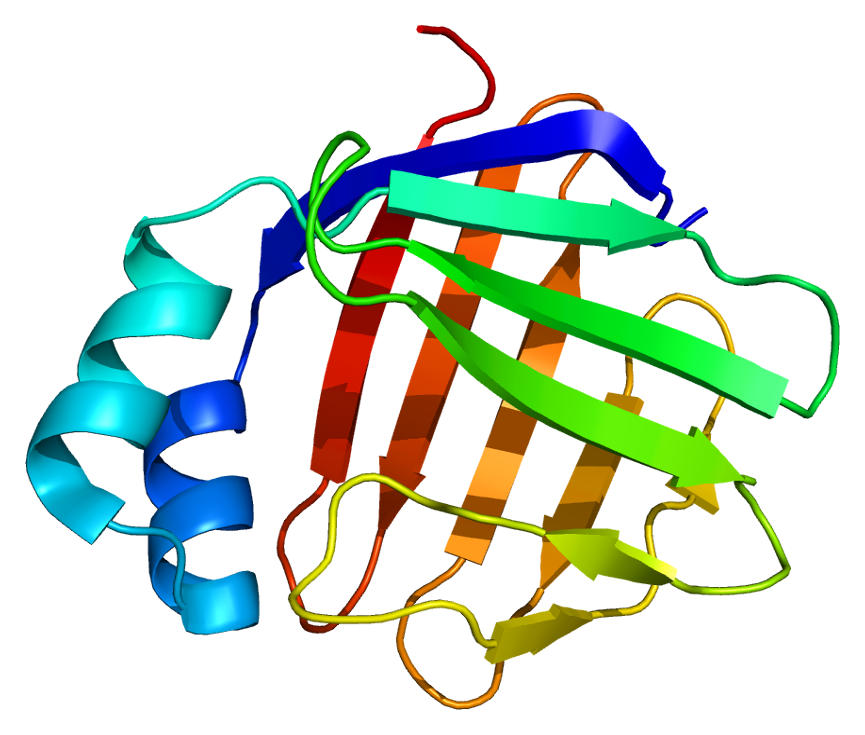

Identifiers
- Aliases: FABP6, I-15P, I-BABP, I-BALB, I-BAP, ILBP, ILBP3, ILLBP, fatty acid binding protein 6
- External IDs: OMIM: 600422; MGI: 96565; GeneCards: FABP6
Available structures
| PDB | Ortholog search: PDBe RCSB |
| PDB | List of PDB id codes 1O1U, 1O1V, 2MM3 |

Gene location (Human)
| Chr. | Chromosome 5 (human) |
| Band | 5q33.3 | Start | 160,187,367 bp |
| Band | 5q33.3 | End | 160,238,735 bp |

Gene location (Mouse)
| Chr. | Chromosome 11 (mouse) |
| Band | 11 B1.1|11 25.81 cM | Start | 43,486,876 bp |
| Band | 11 B1.1|11 25.81 cM | End | 43,492,367 bp |
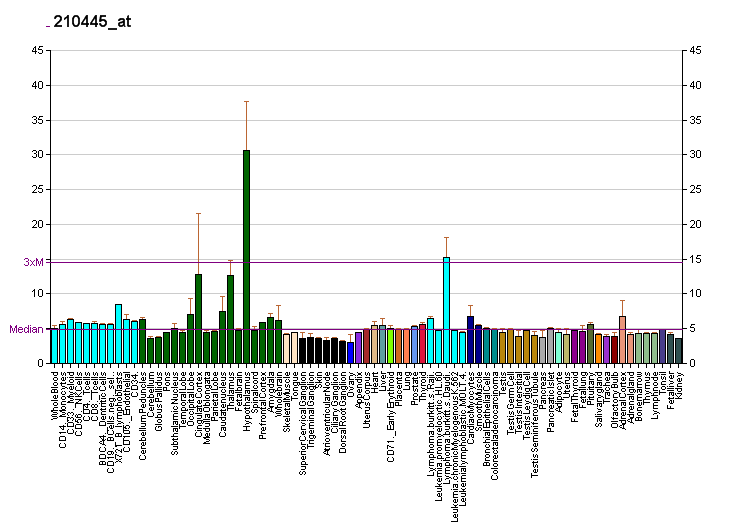
RNA expression pattern
| Bgee | Human / Mouse (ortholog); Top expressed in: mucosa of ileum; right uterine tube; bronchial epithelial cell; olfactory zone of nasal mucosa; nucleus accumbens; caudate nucleus; putamen; testicle; hypothalamus; substantia nigra / Top expressed in: crypt of lieberkuhn of small intestine; Paneth cell; ileum; intestinal villus; conjunctival fornix; blastocyst; epithelium of small intestine; Ileal epithelium; esophagus; cornea; More reference expression data |
| BioGPS | More reference expression data |
Gene ontology
| Molecular function | bile acid binding; lipid binding |
| Cellular component | cytoplasm; cytosol; membrane |
| Biological process | lipid metabolism; triglyceride catabolic process; negative regulation of cell population proliferation; lipid transport |
Sources:Amigo / QuickGO
Orthologs
| Databases | NCBI: entry; OMA: entry |
| Species | Human | Mouse |
| Entrez | 2172 | 16204 |
| Ensembl | ENSG00000170231 | ENSMUSG00000020405 |
| UniProt | P51161 | P51162 |
| RefSeq (mRNA) | NM_001040442; NM_001130958; NM_001445 | NM_008375 |
| RefSeq (protein) | NP_001035532; NP_001124430; NP_001436 | NP_032401 |
| Location (UCSC) | Chr 5: 160.19 – 160.24 Mb | Chr 11: 43.49 – 43.49 Mb |
| PubMed search |
- Wikidata
| View/Edit Human | View/Edit Mouse |

Fatty acid binding protein 6, ileal (gastrotropin), also known as FABP6, is a protein which in humans is encoded by the FABP6 gene.

== Function ==
This gene encodes the ileal fatty acid binding protein. Fatty acid binding proteins are a family of small, highly conserved, cytoplasmic proteins that bind long-chain fatty acids and other hydrophobic ligands. FABP6 and FABP1 (the liver fatty acid binding protein) are also able to bind bile acids. It is thought that FABPs roles include fatty acid uptake, transport, and metabolism. Transcript variants generated by alternate transcription promoters and/or alternate splicing have been found for this gene.
