= Cancers (journal) =

- Discipline: Oncology
- Language: English
- Edited by: Samuel C. Mok, David T. W. Wong, Mary Frances McMullin, Deepak Nagrath

Publication details
- History: 2009–present
- Publisher: MDPI
- Frequency: Monthly
- Open access: Yes
- Impact factor: 4.4 (2024)

Standard abbreviations
- ISO 4: Cancers (Basel)

Indexing
- CODEN: CANCCT
- ISSN: 2072-6694

Links
- Journal homepage

Cancers is a peer-reviewed, open access, medical journal published by MDPI covering all fields of oncology. The editor-in-chief is Samuel C. Mok (The University of Texas MD Anderson Cancer Center). The Irish Association for Cancer Research (IACR) and the Signal Transduction Society (STS) are affiliated societies.

In Research Evaluation, Ángeles Oviedo-García highlighted irregularities concerning the volume of material the journal publishes and citation practices which may contribute to an over-inflated impact factor. Multiple systematic reviews appearing in Cancers have been identified as contributing to "citation contamination" through the repeated citation of fabricated work.

== Abstracting and indexing ==
The journal is abstracted and indexed in:

- Science Citation Index Expanded
- Scopus
- CINAHL
- EMBASE

In 2024, the journal had an impact factor of 4.4.

In 2025, Cancers was rated "0" by the Julkaisufoorumi, Finland's national research classification system. This means that the journal did not meet the national research standards for peer-review or having an appropriate editorial board.
