= FABP1 =

Protein-coding gene in the species Homo sapiens

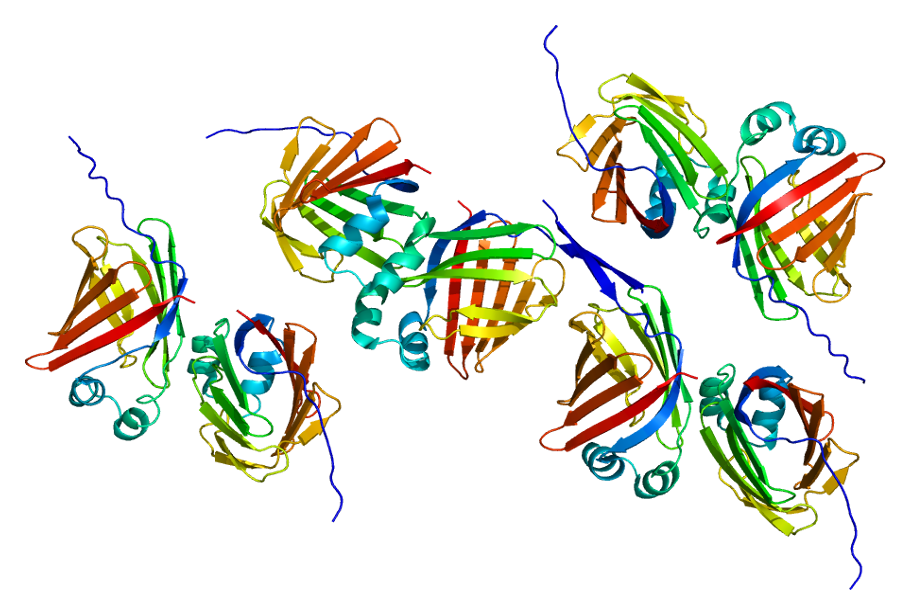

Identifiers
- Aliases: FABP1, FABPL, L-FABP, fatty acid binding protein 1
- External IDs: OMIM: 134650; MGI: 95479; GeneCards: FABP1
Available structures
| PDB | Ortholog search: PDBe RCSB |
| PDB | List of PDB id codes 2F73, 2L67, 2L68, 2LKK, 2PY1, 3B2H, 3B2I, 3B2J, 3B2K, 3B2L, 3STK, 3STM, 3STN, 3VG2, 3VG3, 3VG4, 3VG5, 3VG6, 3VG7 |

Gene location (Human)
| Chr. | Chromosome 2 (human) |
| Band | 2p11.2 | Start | 88,122,982 bp |
| Band | 2p11.2 | End | 88,128,062 bp |

Gene location (Mouse)
| Chr. | Chromosome 6 (mouse) |
| Band | 6 C1|6 32.14 cM | Start | 71,176,811 bp |
| Band | 6 C1|6 32.14 cM | End | 71,182,007 bp |
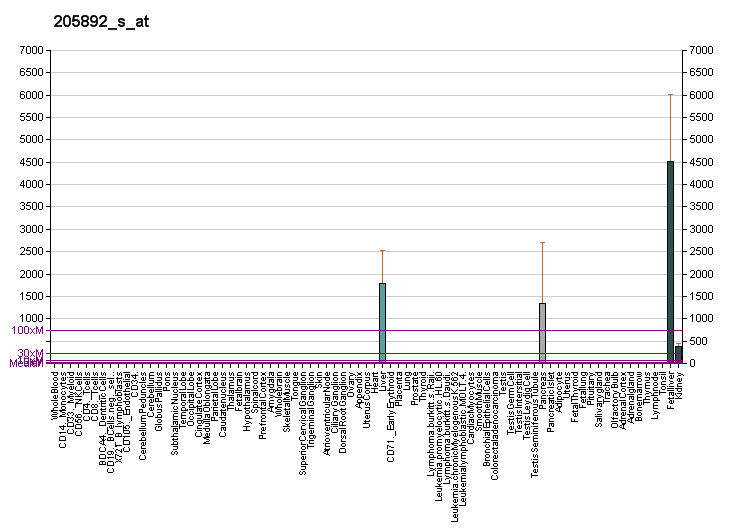
RNA expression pattern
| Bgee | Human / Mouse (ortholog); Top expressed in: mucosa of transverse colon; jejunal mucosa; mucosa of sigmoid colon; mucosa of ileum; rectum; right lobe of liver; cecum; human kidney; appendix; duodenum / Top expressed in: left lobe of liver; migratory enteric neural crest cell; gallbladder; duodenum; jejunum; human fetus; yolk sac; right lung lobe; epithelium of small intestine; intestinal villus; More reference expression data |
| BioGPS | More reference expression data |
Gene ontology
| Molecular function | long-chain fatty acid transporter activity; transporter activity; chromatin binding; fatty acid binding; bile acid binding; antioxidant activity; protein binding; phospholipid binding; lipid binding |
| Cellular component | nucleoplasm; apical cortex; peroxisomal matrix; extracellular exosome; nucleus; cytoplasm; cytosol; protein-containing complex |
| Biological process | positive regulation of fatty acid beta-oxidation; positive regulation of hydrolase activity; negative regulation of cysteine-type endopeptidase activity involved in apoptotic process; negative regulation of apoptotic process; triglyceride catabolic process; positive regulation of cell population proliferation; intestinal absorption; cellular response to hypoxia; cellular response to hydrogen peroxide; long-chain fatty acid transport; cellular oxidant detoxification; regulation of lipid metabolic process; transport |
Sources:Amigo / QuickGO
Orthologs
| Databases | NCBI: entry; OMA: entry |
| Species | Human | Mouse |
| Entrez | 2168 | 14080 |
| Ensembl | ENSG00000163586 | ENSMUSG00000054422 |
| UniProt | P07148 | P12710 |
| RefSeq (mRNA) | NM_001443 | NM_017399 |
| RefSeq (protein) | NP_001434 | NP_059095 |
| Location (UCSC) | Chr 2: 88.12 – 88.13 Mb | Chr 6: 71.18 – 71.18 Mb |
| PubMed search |
- Wikidata
| View/Edit Human | View/Edit Mouse |

FABP1 is a human gene coding for the protein product FABP1 (Fatty Acid-Binding Protein 1). It is also frequently known as liver-type fatty acid-binding protein (LFABP).

FABP1 is primarily expressed in the liver where it is involved in the binding, transport and metabolism of long-chain fatty acids (LCFAs), endocannabinoids, phytocannabinoids (and less so for synthetic cannabinoid receptor (CBR) agonists and antagonists) and other hydrophobic molecules. Altered expression of the protein has been linked to metabolic conditions including obesity.

== Discovery ==
The fatty acid-binding proteins (FABPs) were initially discovered in 1972 with experiments using ^{14}C labelled oleate to identify the presence of a soluble fatty acid carrier in the enterocyte responsible for intestinal absorption of (LCFAs). Since then, ten members of the FABP family have been identified in the human genome. Nine are well established (FABP1-9) with a recently discovered tenth (FABP12). Each FABP corresponds to particular organs/tissue around the body where they play a role in fatty-acid uptake, transport and metabolism.

== Gene location ==
The human FABP1 gene is located on the short (p) arm of chromosome 2 from base pair 88,122,982 to base pair 88,128,131.

== Protein structure ==
FABP1 has been found to have a unique structure compared to other members of the FABP family, allowing it to bind multiple ligands simultaneously. It also has a larger solvent-accessible core compared to other FABPs allowing more diverse substrate binding. The "portal hypothesis" has been proposed to explain the binding process of FABPs. It has been suggested that fatty acids enter the solvent-accessible area of the protein through a dynamic region consisting of α-helix II and turns between the βC-βD and βE-βF loops. The fatty acid is then bound in the protein cavity for transport.

== Function ==
The FABPs are a family of small, highly conserved cytoplasmic proteins involved in the binding of LCFAs. FABP1 is expressed abundantly in the human liver where it accounts for 7-11% of the total cytosolic protein, and can also be found in the intestine, kidney, pancreas, stomach and lung. FABP1 is unique in the wider range of other hydrophobic ligands it can bind including bilirubin, monoglycerides, bile acids and fatty acyl CoA. It has been proposed that FABP1 plays a significant role in preventing cytotoxicity by binding heme, fatty acids and other molecules that are potentially toxic when unbound.

== Mutations ==
A missense mutation within exon 3 of the human FABP1 gene results in a Thr to Ala substitution, T94A, in the protein product. Carriers of this particular single nucleotide polymorphism (SNP) exhibit higher baseline plasma-free fatty acid levels, lower BMI and a smaller waist circumference. The T94A mutant has also been associated with metabolic syndrome conditions, cardiovascular disease and T2DM.

== Protein expression ==
=== Suppression ===
Studies with mice to determine the effect of suppressing their Fabp1 gene ortholog have been performed. When provided with high-fat or high-cholesterol based diets those with suppressed FABP1 expression demonstrated a significant impact on metabolic regulation and weight gain.

=== Increased levels in obesity ===
A study in Chinese young adults indicates a strong relationship between serum FABP1 levels and lipid profile, body measurements and homeostatic parameters. Increased BMI and insulin resistance in subjects demonstrated higher serum FABP1 with a particular correlation in subjects with central adiposity. This elevation is suggested to occur as a compensatory up-regulation of the protein in an attempt to counter the high metabolic stress associated with obesity. Alternately obesity may in fact lead the human body to develop resistance to the actions of FABP1 leading to the compensatory up-regulation.

=== Disease marker ===
Evaluation of increased levels of urinary and serum FABP1 have also shown to be effective markers in the detection of intestinal ischaemia, progressive end-stage renal failure and ischaemic damage caused by renal transplantation or cardiac bypass surgery.
