= Edrecolomab =

Monoclonal antibody

Monoclonal antibody
- Type: Whole antibody
- Source: Mouse
- Target: EpCAM (17-1A)

Clinical data
- Trade names: Panorex
- ATC code: L01FX01 (WHO)

Identifiers
- CAS Number: 156586-89-9
- DrugBank: DB13375
- ChemSpider: none
- UNII: 0KYI9U9FSJ

Edrecolomab (MAb17-1A, trade name Panorex) is a mouse-derived monoclonal antibody targeting the cell-surface glycoprotein EpCAM (17-1A), which is expressed on epithelial tissues and on various carcinomas.

Preliminary studies had shown promise of a possible use in patients with stage III colorectal carcinoma (with metastasis to the lymph nodes). No effect has been demonstrated for stage II (locally advanced cancer without spread to the lymph nodes) colon cancer.

Edrecolomab was well tolerated in these studies and as such research has now concentrated on whether it can be of any use in other forms of cancer.
