= FABP2 =

Protein-coding gene in the species Homo sapiens

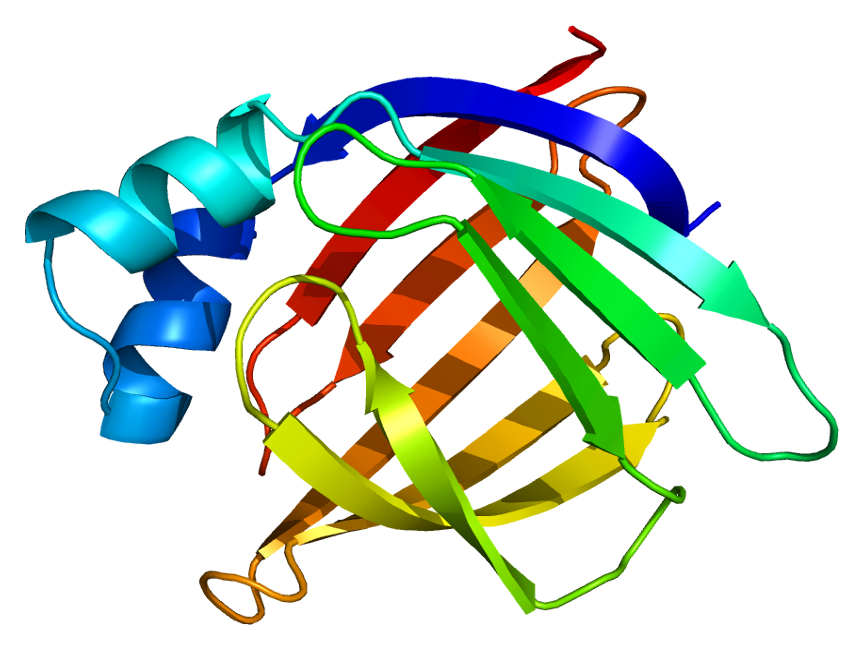

Identifiers
- Aliases: FABP2, FABPI, I-FABP, fatty acid binding protein 2
- External IDs: OMIM: 134640; MGI: 95478; GeneCards: FABP2
Available structures
PDB	Ortholog search: PDBe RCSB
PDB	List of PDB id codes 1KZW, 1KZX, 2MJI, 2MO5, 3AKM, 3IFB

Gene location (Human)
Chr.	Chromosome 4 (human)
Band	4q26	Start	119,317,250 bp
Band	4q26	End	119,322,138 bp

Gene location (Mouse)
Chr.	Chromosome 3 (mouse)
Band	3 G1|3 53.74 cM	Start	122,688,721 bp
Band	3 G1|3 53.74 cM	End	122,693,155 bp
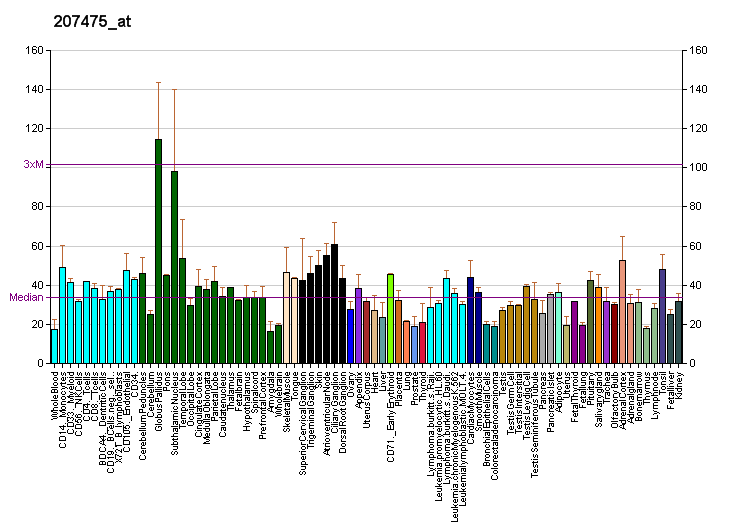
RNA expression pattern
Bgee	Human / Mouse (ortholog); Top expressed in: mucosa of transverse colon; rectum; jejunal mucosa; duodenum; mucosa of sigmoid colon; testicle; epithelium of colon; appendix; mucosa of ileum; muscle tissue / Top expressed in: ileum; jejunum; duodenum; migratory enteric neural crest cell; epithelium of small intestine; intestinal villus; Ileal epithelium; pyloric antrum; Paneth cell; mucous cell of stomach; More reference expression data
BioGPS	More reference expression data
Gene ontology
Molecular function	fatty acid binding; protein binding; lipid binding; long-chain fatty acid binding
Cellular component	cytoplasm; cytosol; intracellular anatomical structure
Biological process	triglyceride catabolic process; intestinal lipid absorption
Sources:Amigo / QuickGO
Orthologs
Databases	NCBI: entry; OMA: entry
Species	Human	Mouse
Entrez	2169	14079
Ensembl	ENSG00000145384	ENSMUSG00000023057
UniProt	P12104	P55050
RefSeq (mRNA)	NM_000134	NM_007980
RefSeq (protein)	NP_000125	NP_032006
Location (UCSC)	Chr 4: 119.32 – 119.32 Mb	Chr 3: 122.69 – 122.69 Mb
PubMed search
- Wikidata
View/Edit Human	View/Edit Mouse

Fatty acid-binding protein 2 (FABP2), also known as Intestinal-type fatty acid-binding protein (I-FABP), is a protein that in humans is encoded by the FABP2 gene.

== Function ==
The intracellular fatty acid-binding proteins (FABPs) belong to a multigene family with nearly twenty identified members. FABPs are divided into at least three distinct types, namely the hepatic-, intestinal- and cardiac-type. They form 14-15 kDa proteins and are thought to participate in the uptake, intracellular metabolism and/or transport of long-chain fatty acids. They may also be responsible in the modulation of cell growth and proliferation. Intestinal fatty acid-binding protein 2 gene contains four exons and is an abundant cytosolic protein in small intestine epithelial cells.

== Clinical significance ==
This gene has a polymorphism at codon 54 that identified an alanine-encoding allele and a threonine-encoding allele. Thr-54 protein is associated with increased fat oxidation and insulin resistance.
