= Lipokine =

Hormone

A lipokine is a lipid-controlling hormone. The term was coined by Hotamisligil Lab in 2008 to classify fatty acids which modulate lipid metabolism by what he called a "chaperone effect".

The lipokine palmitoleic acid (C16:1n7-palmitoleate) travels to the muscles and liver, where it improves cell sensitivity to insulin and blocks fat accumulation in the liver. In addition, researchers observed that palmitoleate suppresses inflammation, which is considered by many to be a primary factor leading to metabolic disease.

Palmitoleic acid also serves as a biomarker for metabolic status. More specifically, a low concentration in the free acid component of the serum indicates a risk of metabolic disease, and that de novo lipogenesis should be stimulated. Additionally, administering palmitoleic acid to a subject (via nutraceutical or other means), positively impacts lipid metabolism.

FAHFAs (fatty acid esters of hydroxy fatty acids) are lipokines formed in adipose tissue. FAHFAs improve glucose tolerance and also reduce adipose tissue inflammation. Palmitic acid esters of hydroxy-stearic acids (PAHSAs) are among the most bioactive members able to activate G-protein coupled receptor 120. Docosahexaenoic acid ester of hydroxy-linoleic acid (DHAHLA) exert anti-inflammatory and pro-resolving properties.

Lipokines play roles in regulation of the Central Nervous System and on adipose tissue. They bind receptors on adipose tissue in order to increase the thermogenic effect. Research has been done aiming to determine how lipokines can be used in order to increase energy expenditure and systematic metabolism in adipose tissue.

The lipokine 12,13-dihydroxy-9Zoctadecenoic acid (12,13-diHOME) is released by Brown Adipose Tissue (BAT) after moderate exercise. This 12,13-diHOME was given to mice and this showed increase skeletal muscle uptake of fatty acids and oxidized the fatty acids more.
