= Adipocyte protein 2 =

Protein found in humans

FABP4
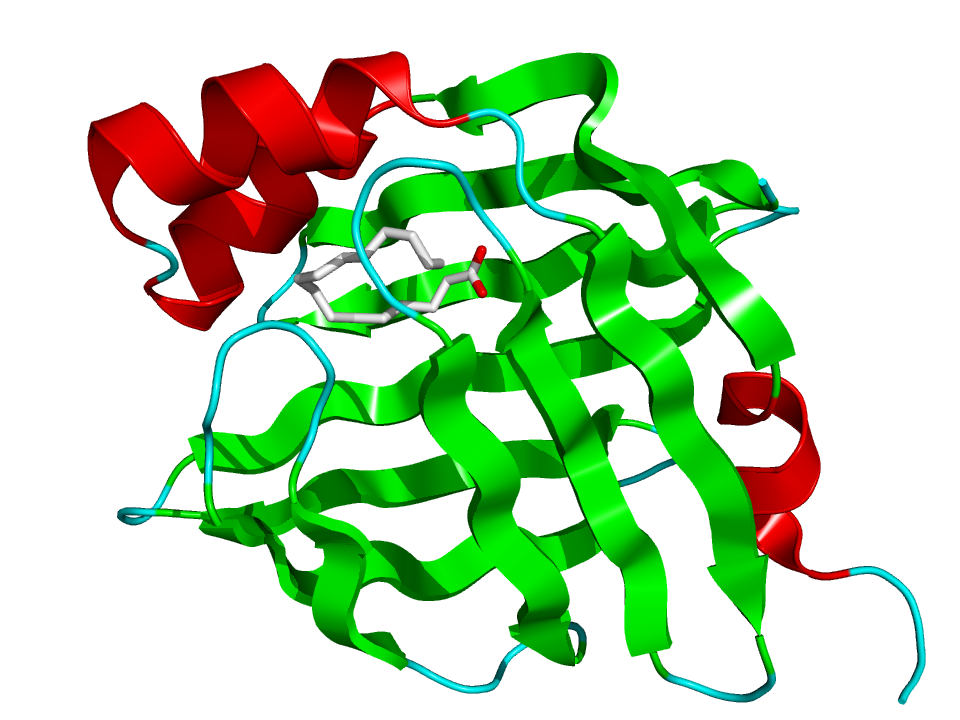

Identifiers
- Aliases: FABP4, A-FABP, AFABP, ALBP, HEL-S-104, aP2, fatty acid binding protein 4
- External IDs: OMIM: 600434; MGI: 88038; GeneCards: FABP4
Available structures
| PDB | Ortholog search: PDBe RCSB |
| PDB | List of PDB id codes 4NNT, 1TOU, 1TOW, 2HNX, 2NNQ, 3FR2, 3FR4, 3FR5, 3P6C, 3P6D, 3P6E, 3P6F, 3P6G, 3P6H, 3Q6L, 3RZY, 4NNS, 5EDB, 5EDC, 5D48, 5D4A, 5D45, 5D47 |

Gene location (Human)
| Chr. | Chromosome 8 (human) |
| Band | 8q21.13 | Start | 81,478,419 bp |
| Band | 8q21.13 | End | 81,483,236 bp |

Gene location (Mouse)
| Chr. | Chromosome 3 (mouse) |
| Band | 3 A1|3 2.56 cM | Start | 10,269,148 bp |
| Band | 3 A1|3 2.56 cM | End | 10,273,636 bp |
RNA expression pattern
| Bgee | Human / Mouse (ortholog); Top expressed in: abdominal fat; pericardium; skin of hip; subcutaneous adipose tissue; vena cava; lactiferous duct; synovial joint; trabecular bone; gastric mucosa; thoracic diaphragm / Top expressed in: intercostal muscle; tunica adventitia of aorta; transitional epithelium of urinary bladder; brown adipose tissue; tunica media of zone of aorta; parotid gland; decidua; gastrula; aortic valve; ascending aorta; More reference expression data |
| BioGPS | n/a |
Gene ontology
| Molecular function | transporter activity; fatty acid binding; lipid binding; long-chain fatty acid transporter activity; long-chain fatty acid binding; hormone receptor binding |
| Cellular component | cytosol; lipid droplet; extracellular exosome; nucleus; cytoplasm |
| Biological process | white fat cell differentiation; regulation of inflammatory response; cytokine production; cholesterol homeostasis; positive regulation of inflammatory response; negative regulation of transcription, DNA-templated; cellular response to lithium ion; negative regulation of protein kinase activity; brown fat cell differentiation; triglyceride catabolic process; cellular response to tumor necrosis factor; transport; response to bacterium; long-chain fatty acid transport; positive regulation of cold-induced thermogenesis |
Sources:Amigo / QuickGO
Orthologs
| Databases | NCBI: entry; OMA: entry |
| Species | Human | Mouse |
| Entrez | 2167 | 11770 |
| Ensembl | ENSG00000170323 | ENSMUSG00000062515 |
| UniProt | P15090 | P04117 |
| RefSeq (mRNA) | NM_001442 | NM_024406 |
| RefSeq (protein) | NP_001433 | NP_077717 |
| Location (UCSC) | Chr 8: 81.48 – 81.48 Mb | Chr 3: 10.27 – 10.27 Mb |
| PubMed search |
- Wikidata
| View/Edit Human | View/Edit Mouse |

Adipocyte protein 2 (aP2) is a carrier protein for fatty acids that is primarily expressed in adipocytes and macrophages. aP2 is also called fatty acid binding protein 4 (FABP4). Blocking this protein either through genetic engineering or drugs has the possibility of treating heart disease and the metabolic syndrome.

== See also ==
- Fatty acid-binding protein
