= Fatty acid–binding protein =

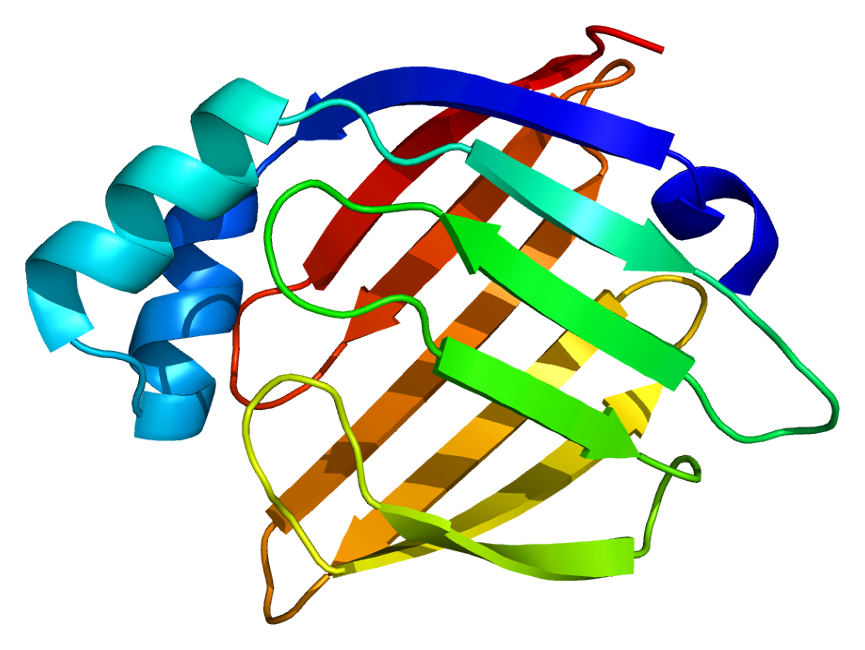
Structure of one of the FABP proteins (FABP3) known as heart-type fatty acid–binding protein.

The fatty acid–binding proteins (FABPs) are a family of transport proteins for fatty acids and other lipophilic substances such as eicosanoids, cannabinoids, and retinoids. These proteins are thought to facilitate the transfer of fatty acids between extra- and intracellular membranes. Some family members are also believed to transport lipophilic molecules from outer cell membrane to certain intracellular receptors such as PPAR.

== Structure ==
FABPs share only moderate sequence homology, but have "virtually superimposable" tertiary structures. The proteins contain ten anti-parallel beta sheets, partly covered by a helix-turn-helix motif that regulates transfer of hydrophobic molecules from membranes. The beta-sheets enclose a water-accessible binding pocket. FABPs have broad specificity, including the ability to bind long-chain (C16-C20) fatty acids, eicosanoids, bile salts and peroxisome proliferators; more hydrophobic molecules tend to bind with higher affinity.

FABPs demonstrate strong evolutionary conservation and are present in species including Drosophila melanogaster, Caenorhabditis elegans, mouse and human. The human genome consists of nine putatively functional protein-coding FABP genes. The most recently identified family member, FABP12, has been less studied than the other variants.

== Function and clinical significance ==
As fatty acids are insoluble in water, the primary function of FABPs is to enhance solubility by providing a hydrophilic binding partner for the fatty acid. This solubilization greatly increases the rate of movement of fatty acids between different membranes and cellular compartments, and their delivery to metabolic enzymes. FABPs may also have tissue-specific functions that reflect differences in lipid and fatty acid metabolism. Tissue-specific roles of FABPs include uptake of dietary lipids in the intestine, regulation of lipid storage and lipid-mediated gene expression in adipose tissue and macrophages, and maintenance of phospholipid membranes in neural tissues.

FABPs are also involved in cellular processes unrelated to direct fatty acid use, such as cell signaling in lipid-dependent signaling and metabolic regulation. These processes include regulation of gene expression, metabolic regulation, and inflammatory response. These signaling functions may be important in certain disease states, such as cancer and metabolic disorders such as obesity and type 2 diabetes. In obesity, for instance, there is often an altered expression of FABPs in adipose tissue, contributing to abnormal lipid metabolism. FABP function is thus a potential therapeutic target for modifying lipid signalling pathways, inflammatory responses, and metabolic regulation in these and related conditions.

== Family members ==
Members of the FABP gene family include:

Protein name	Gene	Tissue distribution	Comment
FABP 1	FABP1	liver	
FABP 2	FABP2	intestinal	
FABP 3	FABP3	muscle and heart	mammary-derived growth inhibitor
FABP 4	FABP4	adipocyte	
FABP 5	FABP5	epidermal	psoriasis-associated
FABP 6	FABP6	ileal	gastrotropin
FABP 7	FABP7	brain	
FABP 8	PMP2	peripheral nervous system	peripheral myelin protein 2
FABP 9	FABP9		
FABP 11	fabp11	restricted to fishes	
FABP 12	FABP12	presence shown in human retinoblastoma cell lines, rodent retina and testis.	

=== Pseudogenes ===
Pseudogene	Comment
FABP3P2	
FABP5P1	
FABP5P2	
FABP5P3	
FABP5P4	
FABP5P5	
FABP5P6	
FABP5P7	
FABP5P8	
FABP5P9	
FABP5P10	
FABP5P11	
FABP5P12	
FABP5P13	
FABP5P14	
FABP5P15	
FABP7P1	
FABP7P2	
FABP12P1	
