= FABP5 =

Protein-coding gene in the species Homo sapiens

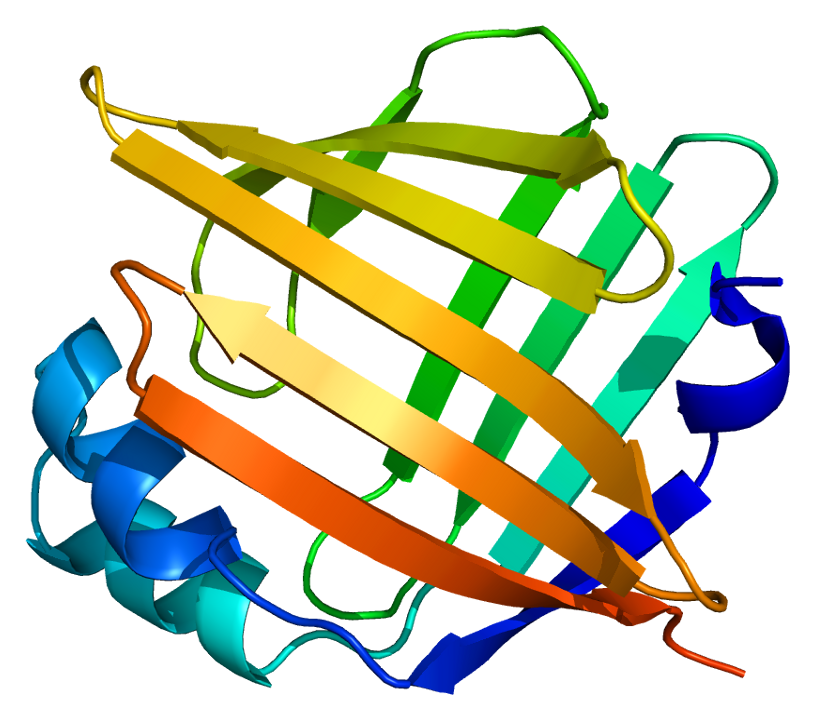

Identifiers
- Aliases: FABP5, E-FABP, EFABP, KFABP, PA-FABP, PAFABP, fatty acid binding protein 5
- External IDs: OMIM: 605168; MGI: 101790; GeneCards: FABP5
Available structures
PDB	Ortholog search: PDBe RCSB
PDB	List of PDB id codes 1B56, 1JJJ, 4AZM, 4AZR, 4LKP, 4LKT

Gene location (Human)
Chr.	Chromosome 8 (human)
Band	8q21.13	Start	81,280,536 bp
Band	8q21.13	End	81,284,777 bp

Gene location (Mouse)
Chr.	Chromosome 3 (mouse)
Band	3|3 A1	Start	10,077,608 bp
Band	3|3 A1	End	10,081,667 bp
RNA expression pattern
Bgee	Human / Mouse (ortholog); Top expressed in: ventricular zone; ganglionic eminence; skin of leg; skin of abdomen; apex of heart; subcutaneous adipose tissue; mucosa of transverse colon; placenta; rectum; vagina / Top expressed in: esophagus; lip; lens; neural tube; ganglionic eminence; stomach; ventricular zone; blastocyst; thymus; skin; More reference expression data
BioGPS	n/a
Gene ontology
Molecular function	transporter activity; lipid binding; protein binding; fatty acid binding; retinoic acid binding; identical protein binding
Cellular component	cytoplasm; nucleoplasm; cytosol; extracellular exosome; extracellular region; plasma membrane; secretory granule membrane; azurophil granule lumen; extracellular space; nucleus; postsynaptic density; membrane; cell junction; synapse; postsynaptic membrane
Biological process	epidermis development; triglyceride catabolic process; phosphatidylcholine biosynthetic process; glucose metabolic process; lipid metabolism; neutrophil degranulation; transport; negative regulation of glucose transmembrane transport; regulation of prostaglandin biosynthetic process; positive regulation of peroxisome proliferator activated receptor signaling pathway; glucose homeostasis; regulation of sensory perception of pain; regulation of retrograde trans-synaptic signaling by endocanabinoid; positive regulation of cold-induced thermogenesis
Sources:Amigo / QuickGO
Orthologs
Databases	NCBI: entry; OMA: entry
Species	Human	Mouse
Entrez	2171	16592
Ensembl	ENSG00000164687	ENSMUSG00000027533
UniProt	Q01469	Q05816
RefSeq (mRNA)	NM_001444	NM_001272097; NM_001272098; NM_010634
RefSeq (protein)	NP_001435	NP_001259026; NP_001259027; NP_034764
Location (UCSC)	Chr 8: 81.28 – 81.28 Mb	Chr 3: 10.08 – 10.08 Mb
PubMed search
- Wikidata
View/Edit Human	View/Edit Mouse

Fatty acid-binding protein, epidermal is a protein that in humans is encoded by the FABP5 gene.

== Function ==
This gene encodes the fatty acid binding protein found in epidermal cells, and was first identified as being upregulated in psoriasis tissue. Fatty acid binding proteins are a family of small, highly conserved, cytoplasmic proteins that bind long-chain fatty acids and other hydrophobic ligands. It is thought that FABPs roles include fatty acid uptake, transport, and metabolism.

The phytocannabinoids (THC and CBD) inhibit endocannabinoid anandamide (AEA) uptake by targeting FABP5, and competition for FABPs may in part or wholly explain the increased circulating levels of endocannabinoids reported after consumption of cannabinoids. Results show that cannabinoids inhibit keratinocyte proliferation, and therefore support a potential role for cannabinoids in the treatment of psoriasis.

== Interactions ==
FABP5 has been shown to interact with S100A7.

== Inhibitors ==
- ART26.12
