= Lipocalin =

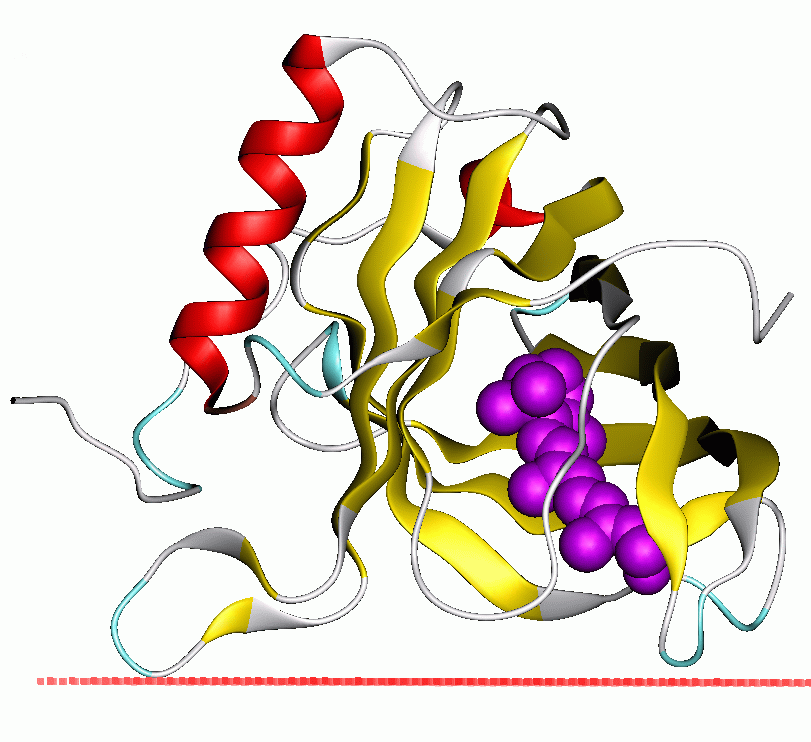
- Retinol-binding protein in a calculated membrane-bound state of the protein 1kt6

Identifiers
- Symbol: Lipocalin
- Pfam: PF00061
- Pfam clan: CL0116
- ECOD: 9.1.1
- InterPro: IPR000566
- PROSITE: PDOC00187
- SCOP2: 1hms / SCOPe / SUPFAM
- OPM superfamily: 50
- OPM protein: 1kt6
Available protein structures:
- PDB: IPR000566 PF00061 (ECOD; PDBsum)
- AlphaFold: IPR000566; PF00061

Lipocalin-like domain
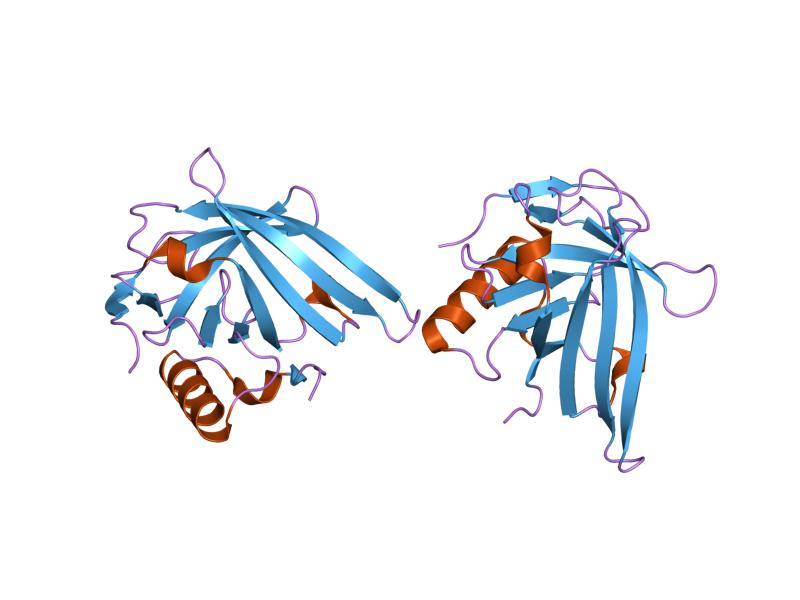
- Structure of the Escherichia coli lipocalin.

Identifiers
- Symbol: Lipocalin_2
- Pfam: PF08212
- Pfam clan: CL0116
- InterPro: IPR013208
Available protein structures:
- PDB: IPR013208 PF08212 (ECOD; PDBsum)
- AlphaFold: IPR013208; PF08212

The lipocalins are a family of proteins which transport small hydrophobic molecules such as steroids, bilins, retinoids, and lipids, and most lipocalins are also able to bind to complexed iron (via siderophores or flavonoids) as well as heme. They share limited regions of sequence homology and a common tertiary structure architecture. This is an eight stranded antiparallel beta barrel with a repeated + 1 topology enclosing an internal ligand binding site.

These proteins are found in gram negative bacteria, vertebrate cells, and invertebrate cells, and in plants. Lipocalins have been associated with many biological processes, among them immune response, pheromone transport, biological prostaglandin synthesis, retinoid binding, and cancer cell interactions.

== Family members ==
The name "lipocalin" has been proposed for this protein family, but cytosolic fatty acid binding proteins are also included. The sequences of most members of the family, the core or kernel lipocalins, are characterised by three short conserved stretches of residues, while others, the outlier lipocalin group, share only one or two of these. Proteins known to belong to this family include alpha-1-microglobulin (protein HC); major urinary proteins; alpha-1-acid glycoprotein (orosomucoid); aphrodisin; apolipoprotein D; beta-lactoglobulin; complement component C8 gamma chain; crustacyanin; epididymal-retinoic acid binding protein (E-RABP); insectacyanin; odorant binding protein (OBP); human pregnancy-associated endometrial alpha-2 globulin (PAEP); probasin (PB), a prostatic protein; prostaglandin D2 synthase; purpurin; Von Ebner's gland protein (VEGP); and lizard epididymal secretory protein IV (LESP IV).

Human proteins that contain lipocalin domain include:

- AMBP, APOD
- C8G, CRABP1, CRABP2
- FABP1, FABP2, FABP3, FABP4, FABP5, FABP6, FABP7
- LCN1, LCN2, LCN8, LCN9, LCN10, LCN12
- OBP2A, OBP2B
- ORM1, ORM2
- PAEP, PERF15, PMP2, PTGDS
- RBP1, RBP2, RBP4, RBP5, RBP7
- UNQ2541

== Structure ==
Although lipocalins are a broad family of greatly varied proteins, their three-dimensional structure is a unifying characteristic. Lipocalins have an eight-stranded, antiparallel, symmetrical β-barrel fold, which is, in essence, a beta sheet which has been rolled into a cylindrical shape. Inside this barrel is located a ligand binding site, which plays an important role in the lipocalin classification as a transport protein. If lipocalins are genetically engineered in the attempt to modify their binding properties, they are called anticalins.

== Function ==
=== Immune response ===
Lipocalin proteins are important key players of nutritional immunity by withholding and sequestering micronutrients. They are thereby able to regulate inflammatory and detoxification processes caused by immune system activation in mammals. They are known respiratory allergens of mice, cats, dogs, horses, and other animals. Examples of lipocalin proteins involved in immune system responses include alpha-1-microglobulin, alpha-1-acid glycoprotein, and C8gamma. Structural information for many immune system influencing lipocalin proteins is available, while their exact role in biological systems is still somewhat unclear. Lipocalin allergens have been shown to evoke a Th2-deviated immune response, important for allergic sensitization, when applied in their apo-form (with an empty calyx devoid of ligands), whereas the holo-form seemed to exert immune-suppressive properties in vitro.

=== Pheromone transport ===
The lipocalin family has been connected with the transport of mammalian pheromones due to easily observable protein-pheromone interactions. Lipocalins are comparatively small in size, and are thus less complicated to study as opposed to large, bulky proteins. They can also bind to various ligands for different biological purposes. Lipocalins have been detected as carrier proteins of important pheromones in the nasal mucus of rodents. Major urinary proteins, a lipocalin subfamily, are found in mouse and rat urine and may act as protein pheromones themselves.

=== Prostaglandin synthesis ===
This family of proteins plays a part in the biological system of terminal prostaglandin synthesis.

=== Retinoid binding ===
Retinol, (vitamin A), is an important micronutrient that affects eyesight, cell differentiation, immune system function, bone growth, and tumor suppression. Retinol absorption and metabolism depends on lipocalins that act as binding proteins. Retinyl esters (present in meats) and beta-carotene (present in plants) are the two main sources of retinoids in the diet. After intake, they are converted to retinol, successively metabolized, and finally bound to retinol binding proteins (lipocalins) in the blood plasma.

=== Cancer cell interactions ===
Because lipocalins are extracellular proteins, their intracellular effects are not obvious, and demand further study. However, lipophilic ligands, present as substituents to the lipocalins, have the ability to enter the cell, where they can act as tumor protease inhibitors. This research suggests another possible route of protein-tumor investigations.

=== Hormone ===
LCN2 (Lipocalin 2) acts as bone-derived hormone which crosses the BBB and acts on PVN paraventricular nucleus of hypothalamus in the brain.

== Allergens ==
Some of the proteins in this family are allergens. Allergies are hypersensitivity reactions of the immune system to specific substances called allergens (such as pollen, stings, drugs, or food) that, in most people, result in no symptoms.

Lipocalins are the predominant mammalian allergenic protein group, constituting approximately 50% of all known allergens in furry animals. Lipocalins easily adhere to clothes and furniture and, therefore, can be transported over extensive distances. They have been detected in homes, classrooms, cars, and daycare centers, where animals are not typically present. In animals, lipocalins can be produced in various glands and tissues, including salivary glands, tongue, sweat glands, mammary glands, and liver. The principal sources of lipocalins are animals’ saliva, hair, dander, skin, and milk.

A nomenclature system has been established for antigens (allergens) that cause IgE-mediated atopic allergies in humans. This nomenclature system is defined by a designation that is composed of the first three letters of the genus; a space; the first letter of the species name; a space and an Arabic number. In the event that two species names have identical designations, they are discriminated from one another by adding one or more letters (as necessary) to each species designation.

The allergens in this family include allergens with the following designations:

- Insects
  - German cockroach: Bla g 4
  - American cockroach: Per a 4
- Carnivorans
  - Domestic dog: Can f 1, Can f 2, Can f 4, Can f 6
  - Domestic cat: Fel d 4, Fel d 7
- Rodents
  - Guinea pig: Cav p 1, Cav p 2, Cav p 3, Cav p 6
  - Golden hamster: Mes a 1
  - House mouse: Mus m 1
  - Brown rat: Rat n 1
  - Siberian hamster: Phod s 1
- Other mammals
  - Domestic cattle: Bos d 2, Bos d 5
  - Domestic horse: Equ c 1, Equ c 2
  - Domestic rabbit: Ory c 1, Ory c 2, Ory c 4

== See also ==
- Retinol binding protein
