= Vitamin A receptor =

Vitamin A receptor may refer to:

- Retinoic acid receptor, or RARs: 3 nuclear receptors activated by derivatives of vitamin A
- Retinoid X receptor, or RXRs: 3 other nuclear receptors that interact with the RAR receptors
- Receptor for retinol uptake STRA6, or its rat homologues Stra6 and Stra6l/RBPR2
