= Retinol-binding protein =

Family of proteins that bind retinol

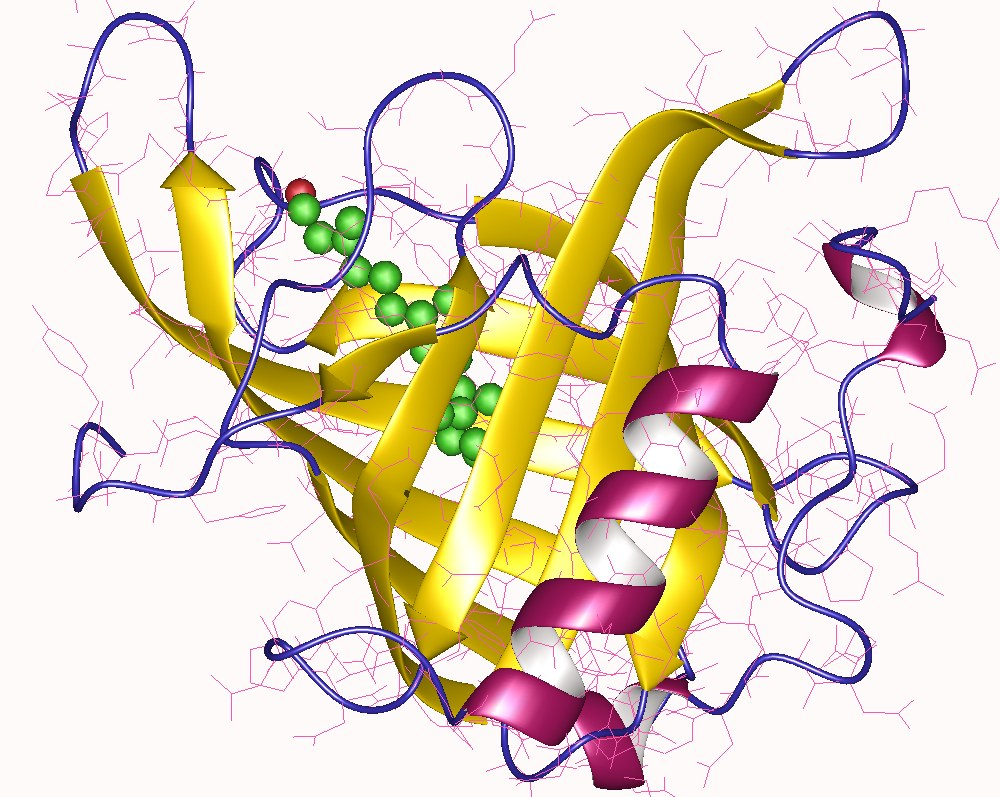
Retinol-binding protein (plasma), Human.

Retinol-binding proteins (RBP) are a family of proteins with diverse functions. They are carrier proteins that bind retinol. Assessment of retinol-binding protein is used to determine visceral protein mass in health-related nutritional studies.

Retinol and retinoic acid play crucial roles in the modulation of gene expression and overall development of an embryo. However, deficit or excess of either one of these substances can cause early embryo mortality or developmental malformations. Regulation of transport and metabolism of retinol necessary for a successful pregnancy is accomplished via RBP. Retinol-binding proteins have been identified within the uterus, embryo, and extraembryonic tissue of the bovine, ovine, and porcine, clearly indicating that RBP plays a role in proper retinol exposure to the embryo and successful transport at the maternal-fetal interface. Further research is necessary to determine the exact effects of poor RBP expression on pregnancy and threshold levels for said expression.

== Genes ==
- Cellular: RBP1, RBP2
  - RBP5 is CRABP1 and RBP7 is CRABP2: named for their ability to bind retinoic acid unlike the other members
- Interstitial: RBP3
- Plasma: RBP4

== RBP in pregnancy ==
Retinol plays a crucial role in the growth and differentiation of various body tissues, and it has been previously characterized that embryos are extremely sensitive to alterations in retinol concentration that can lead to spontaneous abortion and malformations occurring during development. Within a mature animal, retinol is transported from the liver via the circulatory system while bound to RBP to the desired target tissue. RBP is also bound to a carrier protein, transthyretin. The process by which RBP releases retinol for cellular availability is still unknown and not concisely determined.

=== Sites of synthesis ===
Traditionally, RBP is synthesized within the liver with secretion being dependent upon retinol concentrations. However, the concentrations levels do not appear to have an effect upon transcription of RBP messenger RNA (mRNA) which remains constant. Literature reveals that the bovine endometrium has also been identified as a location of RBP synthesis, as well as, the conceptus and extraembryonic tissues of various livestock species.

=== Types ===
1. Plasma retinol-binding protein, the retinol transport vehicle in serum.
2. CRBP I/II, cellular-binding proteins involved in transport of retinol and metabolites into retinyl esters for storage or into retinoic acid.
3. CRABPs, cellular retinoic acid–binding proteins capable of binding retinol and retinoic acid with high affinity. It has also been characterized that CRABPs are involved in many aspects of the retinoic acid signaling pathway such as the regulation and availability of retinoic acid to nuclear receptors.

=== Presence in livestock species during gestation ===
Bovine/Ovine

RBP, identical to that found in plasma has been identified in the placental tissues of both the ovine and the bovine, suggesting that RBP may be highly involved in retinol transport and metabolism during pregnancy. However, exact timing of expression had been yet to be identified. An antiserum specific for bovine conceptus RBP and immunohistochemistry has been utilized to identify the presence of RBP at different stages of early pregnancy. Strong immunostaining and hybridization were observed in the trophectoderm of tubular, but not spherical blastocysts at day 13. RBP mRNA was localized to epithelial cells of the chorion, allantois, and amnion at day 45 of pregnancy. Lastly, RBP mRNA was detected in the cotyledons, the fetal contribution to the placenta and the site of attachment to the uterine epithelium for fetal/maternal exchange. Expression of RBP in developing conceptuses, extraembryonic membranes, and at the fetal-maternal interface indicate that there may be some regulation of retinol transport and metabolism that occurs due to RBP by the extraembryonic membranes. Within the uterus of pregnant bovines, it has been found that RBP synthesis in the luminal and glandular epithelium is quite similar to that of a cyclic animal's; however upon reaching day 17 of the estrous cycle, levels of RBP remain constant and continue to gradually rise throughout gestation. It has also been suggested that ovarian steroids may play a role in regulating uterine RBP expression.

Porcine

All three previously mentioned types of retinol-binding proteins (RBP, CRBP, CRABP) have been identified within the porcine placenta during pregnancy via immunohistochemistry. As previously mentioned, retinol and retinoic acid are modulators of gene expression and are necessary for the proper development and growth of a conceptus. Porcine exhibit a diffuse type placenta that has areolar-gland subunits which allows for transport of larger molecules between dam and fetus. RBP and CRBP have been identified in the endometrial glands and areolar trophoblasts, suggesting that RBP is crucial in transport of retinol from the gland to the trophectoderm of the conceptus. RBP expression has also been identified within the yolk sac, myometrium, oviduct, and numerous other fetal tissues.

== See also ==
- STRA6 (Vitamin A receptor)
