= Prasad Devarajan =

Pediatric nephrologist and physician-scientist

- Education: University of Bombay
- Known for: Research on NGAL as a biomarker of acute kidney injury
- Scientific career
- Fields: Pediatric nephrology; acute kidney injury; renal biomarkers
- Workplaces: Cincinnati Children's Hospital Medical Center; University of Cincinnati College of Medicine

Prasad Devarajan is a pediatric nephrologist and physician-scientist whose research has focused on acute kidney injury (AKI), chronic kidney disease and biomarkers of renal injury. He is the Louise M. Williams Endowed Chair at Cincinnati Children's Hospital Medical Center, where he directs the Nephrology Clinical and Biomarker Laboratory, and is a professor of pediatrics and developmental biology at the University of Cincinnati College of Medicine. A substantial part of Devarajan's research has concerned neutrophil gelatinase-associated lipocalin (NGAL) as an early indicator of kidney injury.

== Education and career ==
Devarajan studied medicine at the University of Bombay in India. He subsequently trained in pediatrics and pediatric nephrology in the United States. His academic career has included appointments in pediatric nephrology at Yale School of Medicine and the Albert Einstein College of Medicine, before his work at Cincinnati Children's Hospital Medical Center and the University of Cincinnati.

At Cincinnati Children's, his appointments have included the Director of Nephrology and Hypertension, Louise M. Williams Endowed Chair in Pediatrics and leadership of clinical and research laboratories concerned with nephrology and renal biomarkers. He is also medical director of the hospital's Comprehensive Stone Center.

== Research ==
=== Acute kidney injury and NGAL ===
Devarajan's research on AKI has included studies of the cellular response to ischemic and nephrotoxic injury and the search for biomarkers capable of detecting kidney injury before conventional changes in serum creatinine become apparent.

In 2003, Devarajan and colleagues reported in the Journal of the American Society of Nephrology that NGAL expression increased following experimental ischemic renal injury and proposed urinary NGAL as an early non-invasive marker of renal injury.

A 2005 study published in The Lancet evaluated NGAL in 71 children undergoing cardiopulmonary bypass. Twenty of the children developed acute renal injury. In those patients, increases in urinary and serum NGAL were detectable within two hours after surgery, whereas diagnosis on the basis of serum creatinine occurred one to three days later. The study concluded that NGAL concentrations had potential as early predictive biomarkers of renal injury following cardiac surgery.

Devarajan later co-authored a 2009 systematic review and meta-analysis examining NGAL across 19 studies from eight countries involving more than 2,000 patients. The analysis found that NGAL had diagnostic value for AKI and was also associated with outcomes including the need for renal replacement therapy and in-hospital mortality, although its performance varied by clinical setting and patient population.

=== Lupus nephritis and other kidney disease ===
Devarajan has also conducted research on non-invasive biomarkers of lupus nephritis. He was among the investigators who developed the Renal Activity Index for Lupus (RAIL), a composite measure based on urinary biomarkers intended to estimate renal inflammatory activity without relying solely on kidney biopsy. A 2016 study in children and young adults found that the biomarker-based index correlated with histologic activity in lupus nephritis. Later studies prospectively evaluated and further developed RAIL in pediatric and adult populations.

== Honors and awards ==
- ScholarGPS Awards for Highly Ranked Scholar - Lifetime - in All Fields, Nephrology, Biomarker, Acute Kidney Injury in top 0.05%
- Thomson Reuters The Worlds Most Influential Scientific Minds 2014
- ANIO Award for Academic Excellence (2015)
- Jeff Gray Translating Mechanisms to Management in AKI Award (2016)
- Elected to Association of American Physicians (2020)

== Selected publications ==
- Mishra J, Ma Q, Prada A, et al. “Identification of neutrophil gelatinase-associated lipocalin as a novel early urinary biomarker for ischemic renal injury.” Journal of the American Society of Nephrology. 2003;14(10):2534-2543.
- Mishra J, Dent C, Tarabishi R, et al. “Neutrophil gelatinase-associated lipocalin (NGAL) as a biomarker for acute renal injury after cardiac surgery.” The Lancet. 2005;365(9466):1231-1238.
- Haase M, Bellomo R, Devarajan P, Schlattmann P, Haase-Fielitz A. “Accuracy of neutrophil gelatinase-associated lipocalin (NGAL) in diagnosis and prognosis in acute kidney injury: a systematic review and meta-analysis.” American Journal of Kidney Diseases. 2009;54(6):1012-1024.
- Brunner HI, Bennett MR, Abulaban K, et al. “Development of a novel renal activity index of lupus nephritis in children and young adults.” Arthritis Care & Research. 2016;68(7):1003-1011.
