= Apolipoprotein D =

Protein-coding gene in the species Homo sapiens

APOD
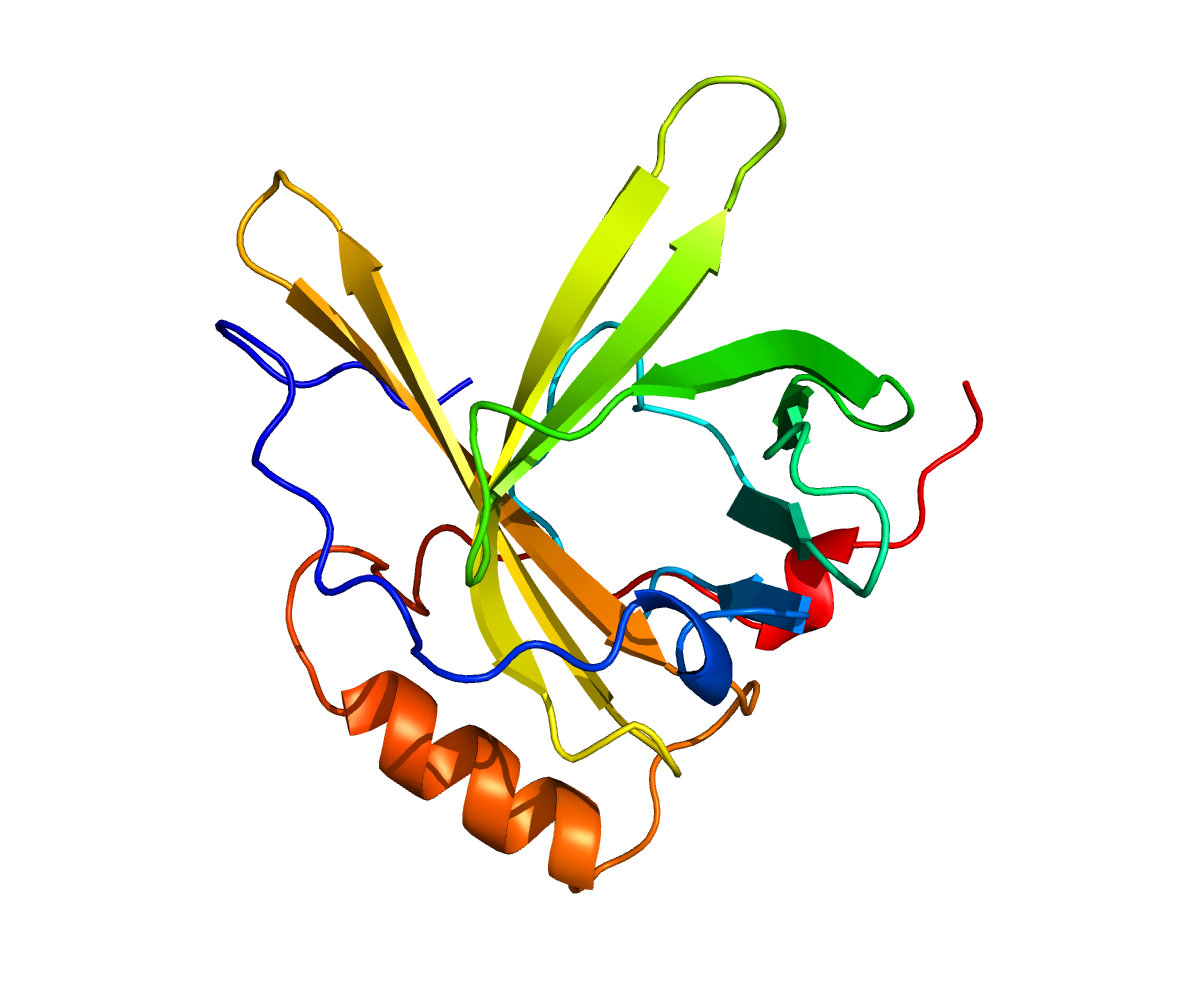

Identifiers
- Aliases: APOD, Apod, apolipoprotein D
- External IDs: OMIM: 107740; MGI: 88056; GeneCards: APOD
Available structures
PDB	Ortholog search: PDBe RCSB
PDB	List of PDB id codes 2HZQ, 2HZR

Gene location (Human)
Chr.	Chromosome 3 (human)
Band	3q29	Start	195,568,705 bp
Band	3q29	End	195,584,033 bp

Gene location (Mouse)
Chr.	Chromosome 16 (mouse)
Band	16 B2|16 21.41 cM	Start	31,115,010 bp
Band	16 B2|16 21.41 cM	End	31,133,626 bp
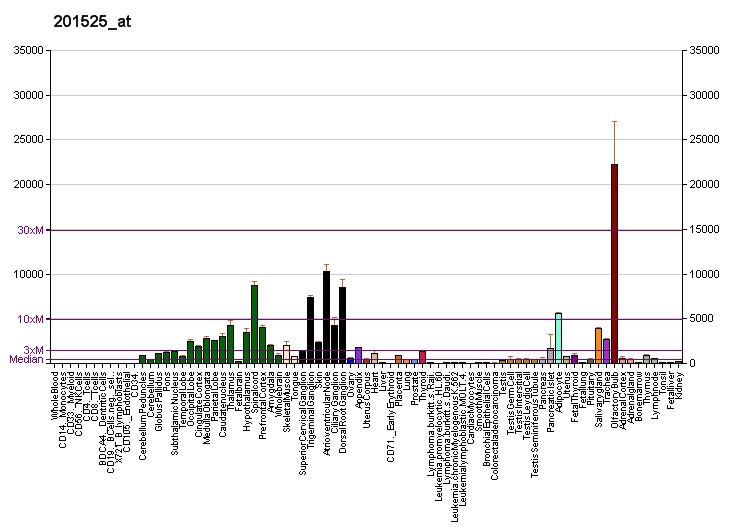
RNA expression pattern
Bgee	Human / Mouse (ortholog); Top expressed in: olfactory bulb; spinal ganglia; trigeminal ganglion; tibial nerve; gastric mucosa; right coronary artery; right lobe of thyroid gland; C1 segment; inferior ganglion of vagus nerve; right lung / Top expressed in: vestibular membrane of cochlear duct; stria vascularis; deep cerebellar nuclei; skin of external ear; olfactory epithelium; ankle; median eminence; pontine nuclei; ankle joint; optic nerve; More reference expression data
BioGPS	More reference expression data
Gene ontology
Molecular function	lipid transporter activity; transporter activity; cholesterol binding; protein binding; small molecule binding; lipid binding
Cellular component	cytosolic ribosome; intracellular anatomical structure; soma; dendrite; endoplasmic reticulum; perinuclear region of cytoplasm; extracellular exosome; extracellular space; extracellular region; cytoplasm
Biological process	negative regulation of T cell migration; negative regulation of platelet-derived growth factor receptor signaling pathway; negative regulation of monocyte chemotactic protein-1 production; negative regulation of smooth muscle cell proliferation; tissue regeneration; lipid metabolism; response to reactive oxygen species; negative regulation of smooth muscle cell-matrix adhesion; ageing; negative regulation of lipoprotein lipid oxidation; brain development; peripheral nervous system axon regeneration; response to axon injury; angiogenesis; glucose metabolic process; negative regulation of focal adhesion assembly; negative regulation of protein import into nucleus; negative regulation of cytokine production involved in inflammatory response; lipid transport; transport
Sources:Amigo / QuickGO
Orthologs
Databases	NCBI: entry; OMA: entry
Species	Human	Mouse
Entrez	347	11815
Ensembl	ENSG00000189058	ENSMUSG00000022548
UniProt	P05090	P51910
RefSeq (mRNA)	NM_001647	NM_001301353; NM_001301354; NM_007470
RefSeq (protein)	NP_001638	NP_001288282; NP_001288283; NP_031496
Location (UCSC)	Chr 3: 195.57 – 195.58 Mb	Chr 16: 31.12 – 31.13 Mb
PubMed search
- Wikidata
View/Edit Human	View/Edit Mouse

Apolipoprotein D (ApoD) is a protein that in humans is encoded by the APOD gene. Unlike other lipoproteins, which are mainly produced in the liver, apolipoprotein D is mainly produced in the brain and testes. It is a 29 kDa glycoprotein discovered in 1963 as a component of the high-density lipoprotein (HDL) fraction of human plasma. It is the major component of human mammary cyst fluid. The human gene encoding it was cloned in 1986 and the deduced protein sequence revealed that ApoD is a member of the lipocalin family, small hydrophobic molecule transporters. ApoD is 169 amino acids long, including a secretion peptide signal of 20 amino acids. It contains two glycosylation sites (aspargines 45 and 78) and the molecular weight of the mature protein varies from 20 to 32 kDa (see figure 1).

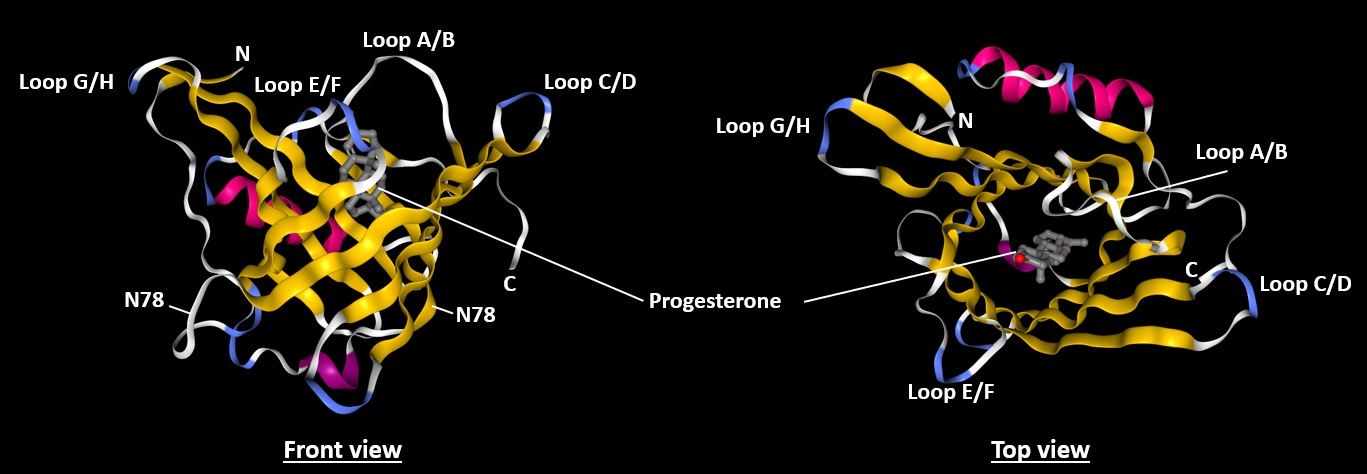
Rassart Figure 1

The resolved tertiary structure shows that ApoD is composed of 8 anti-parallel β-strands forming a hydrophobic cavity capable of receiving different ligands. ApoD also contains 5 cysteine residues, 4 of which are involved in intra-molecular disulfide bonds.

== Function ==
Apolipoprotein D (ApoD) is a component of HDL that has no marked similarity to other apolipoprotein sequences. It has a high degree of homology to plasma retinol-binding protein and other members of the alpha 2 microglobulin protein superfamily of carrier proteins, also known as lipocalins. It is a glycoprotein of estimated molecular weight 33 KDa. Apo-D is closely associated with the enzyme lecithin-cholesterol acyltransferase (LCAT) - an enzyme involved in lipoprotein metabolism. ApoD has also been shown to be an important link in the transient interaction between HDL and low-density lipoprotein (LDL) particles and between HDL particles and cells.

=== Interactions and ligands ===
ApoD was shown to bind steroid hormones such as progesterone and pregnenolone with a relatively strong affinity, and to estrogens with a weaker affinity. Molecular modeling studies identified bilirubin, a breakdown product of heme, as a potential ligand. Arachidonic acid (AA) was identified as an ApoD ligand with a much better affinity than that of progesterone or pregnenolone. AA is the precursor of prostaglandins and leukotrienes, molecules that are involved in inflammation, platelet aggregation and cellular regulation. A very poor binding between ApoD and cholesterol has also been observed. Other ApoD ligands include E-3-methyl-2-hexenoic acid, a scent molecule present in body odor secretions; retinoic acid, which is involved in cellular differentiation; and sphingomyelin and sphingolipids, which are major components of HDL and cell membranes. The fact that apoD may bind such a large variety of ligands strongly support the hypothesis that it could be a multi-ligand, multi-functional protein.

== Clinical significance ==
APOD is a biomarker of androgen insensitivity syndrome (AIS). APOD is an androgen up-regulated gene in normal scrotal fibroblast cells in comparison to labia majora cells in females with complete AIS (CAIS). APOD is associated with neurological disorders and nerve injury, especially related to myelin sheath. APOD was shown to be elevated in a rat model of stroke. APOD is elevated in patients with schizophrenia, bipolar disorder, and Alzheimer's disease.

=== ApoD expression in cells and tissues ===
Analysis of the ApoD gene promoter region identified a large number of promoter regulatory elements, among which are response elements to steroids (such as estrogen and progesterone) and glucocorticoids. Response elements to fatty acids, acute phase proteins, serum, and to the immune factor NF-κB were also observed. The presence of such a large number of regulatory sequences suggests that the regulation of its expression is very complex.

ApoD has been identified in 6 mammalian species as well as in chickens, fruit flies, plants and bacteria. In humans, monkeys, rabbits and guinea pigs, ApoD is highly expressed in the nervous system (brain, cerebellum, and peripheral nerves). Otherwise, expression levels of ApoD vary largely from organ to organ and species to species, with humans displaying the most diverse expression of ApoD, and mice and rats almost exclusively expressing ApoD in the nervous system (see Figure 2).

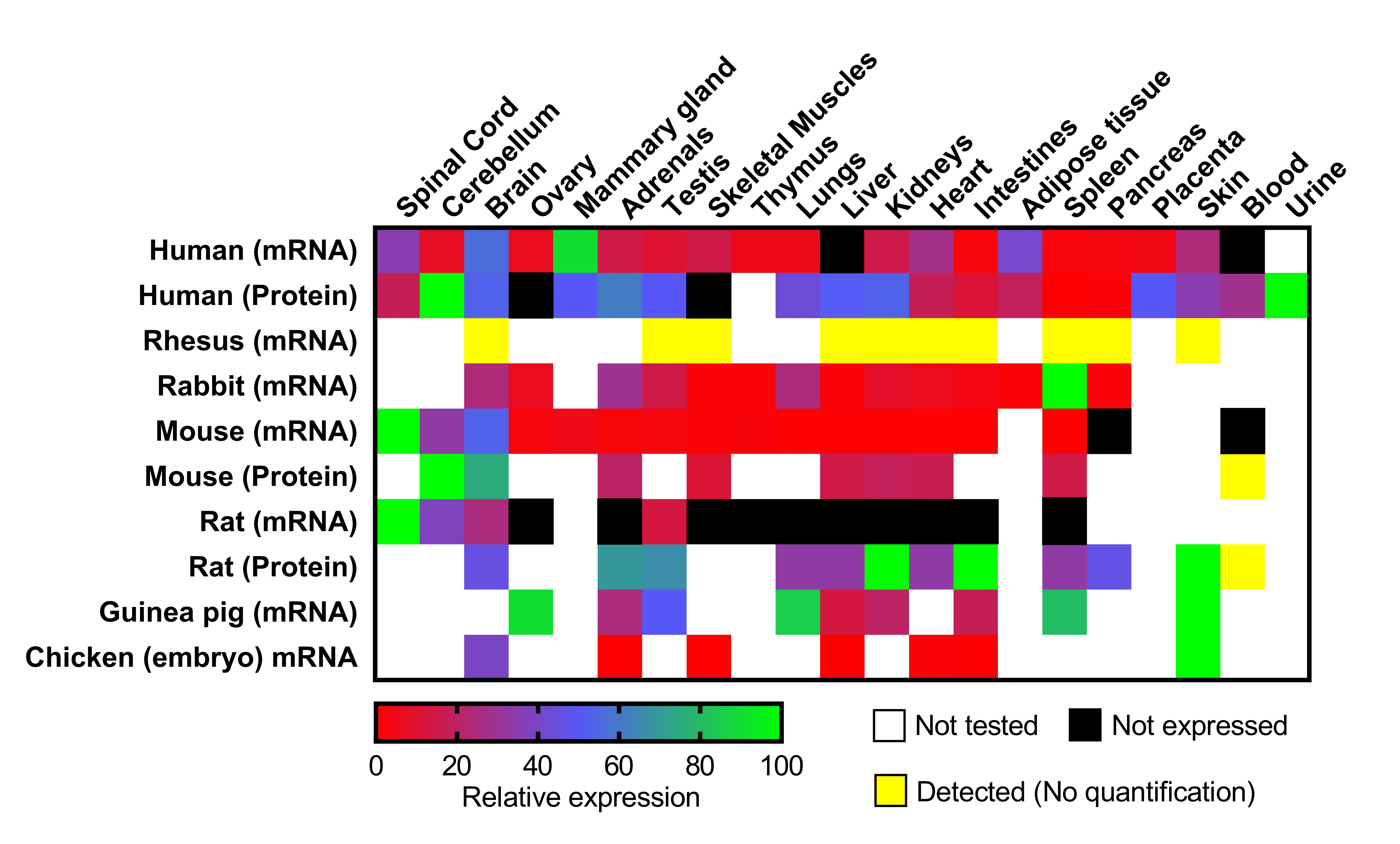
Rassart Figure 2

ApoD concentration in human plasma varies between 5 and 23 mg/100 ml. In the nervous system, the ApoD mRNA is expressed by fibroblasts, astrocytes and oligodendrocytes As a glycoprotein with a peptide signal, ApoD is secreted. Yet it can also be actively reinternalized. The transmembrane glycoprotein Basigin (BSG; CD147) was identified as an ApoD receptor. BSG is a membrane glycoprotein receptor, a member of the immunoglobulin family, involved in several pathologies such as cancer and Alzheimer's disease.

=== Modulation of ApoD expression ===
Studies on several cell types have shown that ApoD expression can be induced by several stressing situations such as growth arrest, senescence, oxidative and inflammatory stresses. ApoD expression is also increased in several neuropathologies. ApoD expression is modulated in several pathologies such as HDL familial deficiency, Tangier disease, LCAT familial deficit and type 2 diabetes. It is overexpressed in numerous cancers, including breast, ovary, prostate, skin and central nervous system (CNS) cancer. In many cases, its expression is correlated with highly differentiated, non-invasive and non-metastatic state.

A role in lipid metabolism has been identified for ApoD by a study on transgenic (Tg) mice overexpressing human ApoD in the CNS. These mice slowly develop a hepatic and muscular steatosis accompanied with insulin resistance. However, none of the Tg mice develop obesity nor diabetes. ApoD induced lipid accumulation is not due to de novo lipogenesis but rather from increased lipid uptake in response to prostaglandin overproduction.

Plasma ApoD levels decrease significantly during normal uncomplicated pregnancy. ApoD is further decreased in women with excessive gestational weight gain and their newborns. In these women, the ApoD concentration was tightly associated with the lipid parameters. In morbidly obese women (BMI over 40) adipose tissues, ApoD protein expression is positively correlated with parameters of metabolic health. ApoD-null female mice (mice in which the ApoD gene was inactivated) present progressive (up to 50%) bone volume reduction with aging.

=== ApoD and the nervous system ===
Both ApoD and Apolipoprotein E (ApoE) protein levels increase drastically at the site of regeneration following a nerve crush injury in the rat. Similar observations have been made in rabbits, marmoset monkeys and in mice. Elevated levels of ApoD were observed in the cerebrospinal fluid, hippocampus and cortex of human patients with Alzheimer's disease, cerebrovascular disease, motoneuron disease, meningoencephalitis and stroke. ApoD expression is altered in plasma and post-mortem brains of patients with schizophrenia. In patients with Parkinson's disease or with multiple sclerosis, ApoD expression is strongly increased in glial cells of the substantia nigra.

Niemann-Pick type C (NPC) is a genetic disorder affecting cholesterol transport that is accompanied by chronic progressive neurodegeneration. In animal models of NPC, ApoD expression is increased in the plasma and the brain. In rats, ApoD expression increases in the hippocampus after enthorinal cortex lesioning. ApoD mRNA and protein increases in the ipsilateral region of hippocampus as early as 2 days post-lesion (DPL), remains high for 10 days and returns to normal after 14 DPL, a period considered necessary for a complete reinervation. Similar results are obtained after injection of kainic acid, an analog of glutamic acid which causes a severe neurodegenerative injury in the hippocampus or after experimentally-induced stoke. ApoD expression is also increased in the aging brain. Altogether, these data suggest that ApoD plays an important role in neural preservation and protection.

Tg mice are less sensitive to oxidative stress induced by paraquat, a free oxygen radical generator, and present reduced lipid peroxidation levels. In contrast, apoD-null mice show increased sensitivity to oxidative stress, increased brain lipid peroxidation and impaired locomotor and learning abilities. Similar results have been observed in a drosophila model. Mice infected with the human coronavirus OC43 develop encephalitis and inflammatory demyelination of the CNS, a disease very similar to multiple sclerosis. Tg mice infected with OC43 display increased survivability compared to control animals. Tg mice treated with kainic acid show a significant reduction of inflammatory responses and a much stronger protection against apoptosis in the hippocampus than control animals. ApoD-null mice crossed with APP-PS1 mice, a mouse model of Alzheimer's disease, displayed a 2-fold increase of hippocampal amyloid plaque load. In contrast, the progeny of Tg mice crossed with APP-PS1 mice displayed reduced hippocampal plaque load by 35%, and a 35% to 65% reduction of amyloid peptide levels.
