= Microglobulin =

Microglobulin is a globulin of relatively small molecular weight. It can be contrasted to macroglobulin.,

Examples include:

- Beta-2 microglobulin
- Alpha-1-microglobulin
