= Odorant-binding protein 2A =

Protein-coding gene in the species Homo sapiens

OBP2A
Available structures
PDB	Ortholog search: PDBe RCSB
PDB	List of PDB id codes 4RUN

Identifiers
- Aliases: OBP2A, LCN13, OBP, OBP2C, OBPIIa, hOBPIIa, odorant binding protein 2A
- External IDs: OMIM: 164320; MGI: 3651927; HomoloGene: 135821; GeneCards: OBP2A; OMA:OBP2A - orthologs

Gene location (Human)
Chr.	Chromosome 9 (human)
Band	9q34.3	Start	135,546,126 bp
Band	9q34.3	End	135,549,969 bp

Gene location (Mouse)
Chr.	Chromosome 2 (mouse)
Band	2|2 A3	Start	25,627,021 bp
Band	2|2 A3	End	25,630,109 bp
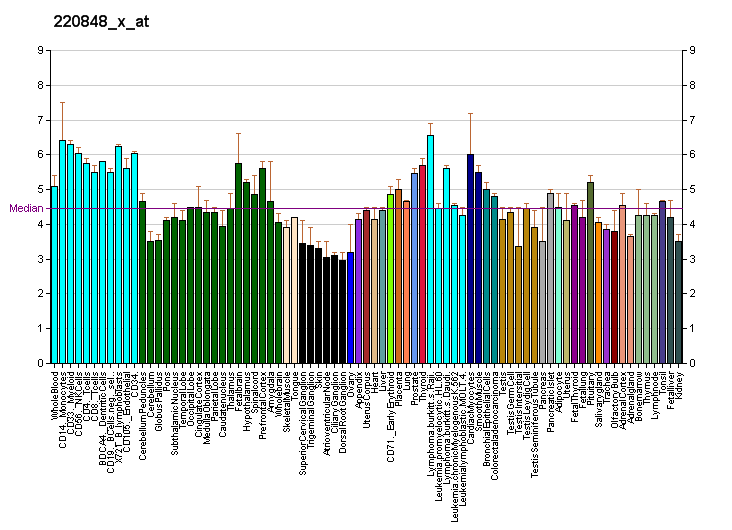

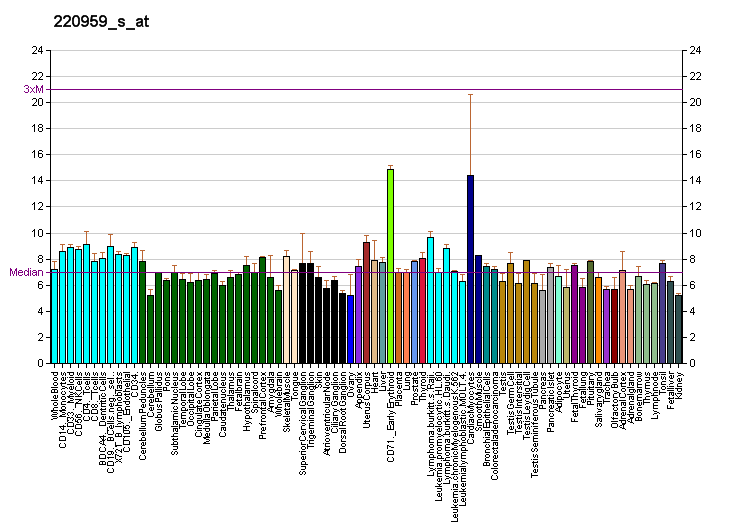
RNA expression pattern
Bgee	Human / Mouse (ortholog); Top expressed in: right uterine tube; skin of leg; caput epididymis; skin of abdomen; testicle; right testis; left testis; bone; placenta; bone marrow / Top expressed in: embryo; hypothalamus; striatum of neuraxis; olfactory bulb; pancreas; islet of Langerhans; dentate gyrus of hippocampal formation granule cell; Cortex of frontal lobe; superior frontal gyrus; thymus; More reference expression data
BioGPS	More reference expression data
Gene ontology
Molecular function	odorant binding; small molecule binding
Cellular component	extracellular region; cellular component
Biological process	sensory perception of chemical stimulus; sensory perception of smell; response to stimulus
Sources:Amigo / QuickGO
Orthologs
Species	Human	Mouse
Entrez	29991	383678
Ensembl	ENSG00000122136	ENSMUSG00000079539
UniProt	Q9NY56	A2BHR0
RefSeq (mRNA)	NM_001293189; NM_001293193; NM_014582	NM_001099301; NM_001378280
RefSeq (protein)	NP_001280118; NP_001280122; NP_055397	NP_001365209
Location (UCSC)	Chr 9: 135.55 – 135.55 Mb	Chr 2: 25.63 – 25.63 Mb
PubMed search
- Wikidata
View/Edit Human	View/Edit Mouse

Odorant-binding protein 2a is a protein that in humans is encoded by the OBP2A gene.

This gene encodes a small extracellular protein belonging to the lipocalin superfamily. The protein is thought to transport small, hydrophobic, volatile molecules or odorants through the nasal mucus to olfactory receptors, and may also function as a scavenger of highly concentrated or toxic odors. The protein is expressed as a monomer in the nasal mucus, and can bind diverse types of odorants with a higher affinity for aldehydes and fatty acids. This gene and a highly similar family member are located in a cluster of lipocalin genes on chromosome 9. Alternatively spliced transcript variants have been described, but their biological validity has not been determined.
