= Alpha-1-microglobulin =

Alpha-1-microglobulin (A1M, α1-microglobulin, sometimes also called Protein HC) is a microglobulin, a small globular protein. It is found in all vertebrates, including humans, and is distributed in blood plasma and extravascular tissues of all organs. It is synthesized in most cells of the body, but mainly in the liver from a gene that codes for the alpha-1-microglobulin/bikunin precursor.

== Structure ==
Human A1M is composed of a 183-amino-acid peptide carrying three carbohydrate chains. It belongs to a protein family, the lipocalins, all members of which are shaped as a basket built from eight beta-strands of the peptide chain. A cysteine residue on one of the loops at the open end of the basket is of central importance for the function.

== Function ==
A1M binds and degrades heme, is a radical scavenger as well as a reductase. A model has been proposed in which A1M is described as a circulating “waste bin” which continuously removes free radicals and oxidizing agents, particularly heme, from the tissues. It is subsequently transported to the kidneys, where it is broken down. The protein is therefore believed to protect cells and tissues against the damage that is induced by abnormally high concentrations of free hemoglobin and/or reactive oxygen species (also called “oxidative stress”).

A1M is also immunoregulatory: the immune response of lymphocytes and neutrophils is partly suppressed by A1M.

== Role in diagnosis ==
A1M can be used as an indicator of proteinuria. The test can be regarded as positive when the ratio of A1M (in milligrams) and creatinine in millimoles in the urine is over 0.7 mg/mmol.

A test for preeclampsia, where A1M serves as the diagnostic marker, has been proposed. It is based upon the fact that oxidative stress in the placenta tissue triggers the endogenous synthesis and plasma concentration of the protein.

== Therapeutic potential ==
A1M is a candidate for a number of therapeutic applications which includes the treatment or alleviation of preeclampsia, tissue damage caused by bleeding in brain, and chronic leg ulcers.
