= Receptor for retinol uptake STRA6 =

STRA6

Identifiers
- Aliases: STRA6, MCOPCB8, MCOPS9, PP14296, stimulated by retinoic acid 6, signaling receptor and transporter of retinol STRA6
- External IDs: OMIM: 610745; MGI: 107742; GeneCards: STRA6

Gene location (Human)
Chr.	Chromosome 15 (human)
Band	15q24.1	Start	74,179,466 bp
Band	15q24.1	End	74,212,267 bp

Gene location (Mouse)
Chr.	Chromosome 9 (mouse)
Band	9|9 B	Start	57,971,071 bp
Band	9|9 B	End	58,061,279 bp
RNA expression pattern
Bgee	Human / Mouse (ortholog); Top expressed in: stromal cell of endometrium; placenta; canal of the cervix; pituitary gland; anterior pituitary; gonad; right uterine tube; olfactory zone of nasal mucosa; right testis; prostate / Top expressed in: choroid plexus of fourth ventricle; genital tubercle; retinal pigment epithelium; tail of embryo; gastrula; fallopian tube; somatopleuric mesenchyme; intermediate mesoderm; female urethra; neural tube; More reference expression data
BioGPS	n/a
Gene ontology
Molecular function	retinal binding; retinol binding; retinol transmembrane transporter activity; signaling receptor activity
Cellular component	integral component of membrane; membrane; plasma membrane; integral component of plasma membrane; protein-containing complex
Biological process	pulmonary valve morphogenesis; head morphogenesis; ventricular septum development; cognition; nose morphogenesis; diaphragm development; kidney development; lung development; uterus morphogenesis; pulmonary artery morphogenesis; head development; ear development; adrenal gland development; learning; eyelid development in camera-type eye; retinoid metabolic process; alveolar primary septum development; development of the heart; vocal learning; neuromuscular process; blood vessel development; developmental growth; feeding behavior; artery morphogenesis; smooth muscle tissue development; paramesonephric duct development; lung alveolus development; lung vasculature development; embryonic camera-type eye formation; positive regulation of behavior; female genitalia development; embryonic digestive tract development; face morphogenesis; ductus arteriosus closure; digestive tract morphogenesis; retinol transport; camera-type eye development; signal transduction; vitamin A import
Sources:Amigo / QuickGO
Orthologs
Databases	NCBI: entry; OMA: entry
Species	Human	Mouse
Entrez	64220	20897
Ensembl	ENSG00000137868; ENSG00000288257	ENSMUSG00000032327
UniProt	Q9BX79	O70491
RefSeq (mRNA)	NM_001142617; NM_001142618; NM_001142619; NM_001142620; NM_001199040 NM_001199041; NM_001199042; NM_022369	NM_001162475; NM_001162476; NM_001162479; NM_009291
RefSeq (protein)	NP_001136089; NP_001136090; NP_001136091; NP_001136092; NP_001185969 NP_001185970; NP_001185971; NP_071764	NP_001155947; NP_001155948; NP_001155951; NP_033317
Location (UCSC)	Chr 15: 74.18 – 74.21 Mb	Chr 9: 57.97 – 58.06 Mb
PubMed search
- Wikidata
View/Edit Human	View/Edit Mouse

Receptor for retinol uptake STRA6 is a protein that in humans is encoded by the STRA6 gene (short for "Stimulated by Retinoic Acid 6"). STRA6 is a transmembrane cell-surface receptor for retinol-binding protein. Since STRA6 binds with protein-bound retinol, which is a form of vitamin A, STRA6 is sometimes referred to as a Vitamin A receptor. However, it shouldn't confused with the family of retinoic acid receptors, which are the primary nuclear receptors involved with retinoid signaling. STRA6 is different in that it is a membrane transporter and a cell surface receptor, and in particular a cytokine receptor. STRA6 is primarily known as the receptor for retinol binding protein and for its relevance in the transport of retinol to specific sites such as the eye (Vitamin A). It does this through the removal of retinol (ROH) from the holo-Retinol Binding Protein (RBP) and transports it into the cell to be metabolized into retinoids and/or kept as a retinylester. As a receptor, after holo-RBP is bound, STRA6 activates the JAK/STAT pathway, resulting in the activation of transcription factor, STAT5. These two functions—retinol transporter and cytokine receptor—while using different pathways, are processes that depend on each other.

== Mechanism of action ==
=== Overview ===
In the first step, holo-retinol binding protein (holo-RBP; simply means RBP bound to retinol, i.e. the RBP-ROH complex) binds to the extracellular portion of STRA6. This facilitates the release of retinol through the transporter. ROH is then transferred to cellular retinol binding protein 1 (CRBP1), an intracellular acceptor of retinol that attaches to the CRBP Binding Loop (or CBL) on STRA6. This transport of ROH, in turn, activates JAK2, thereby phosphorylating STRA6 at the Y643 (tyrosine) residue. This phosphorylation enables the extension of the CBL further into the cell. Holo-CRBP-I, leaves the CBL and is replaced by apo-CRBP-I (unbound). Holo-CRBP-I will continue to the Endoplasmic Reticulum (ER) where lecithin retinol acyltransferase (LRAT) is bound. ROH is released to LRAT which will convert retinol into retinylesters. Following the release of holo-CRBP-I from intercellular STRA6, STAT5 is recruited to STRA6 phosphorylated Y643 region where it is then phosphorylated by JAK2. This phosphorylation activates STAT5 which then makes its way to the nucleus to induce expression of target genes including suppressor of cytokine signaling 3 (SOCS3), a strong inhibitor of insulin signaling.

=== Interdependency of cytokine signaling transporter functions ===
Research has demonstrated that overexpression of CRBP-I increases the ability of RBP-ROH complex to phosphorylate STRA6 and, later, JAK2 and STAT5. Suppressing CRBP-I, on the other hand, led to decreased ability of RBP-ROH complex to phosphorylate STRA6 and signaling components. Similarly, reducing the expression of LRAT also decreased the ability of RBP-ROH complex to phosphorylate JAK2 and STAT5. Therefore, both CRBP-I and LRAT are necessary for the STRA6 signaling cascade upon the binding and transport of retinol. JAK2 is also conversely responsible for the activation of STRA6, after which apo-CRBP-I is recruited to the intercellular CBL of STRA6 and vitamin A might be transferred by the receptor to CRBP-I. Thus, both STRA6 signaling and STRA6 transport of vitamin A are dependent upon each other. Uptake of retinol is required for STRA6 signaling and JAK2 activation of STRA6 is necessary for retinol uptake.

== Clinical significance ==
STRA6 can be found at high levels in various tissues including: the choroid plexus, the brain microvascular, testis, the spleen, kidney, eye, the placenta, and the female reproductive tract. However, it is surprisingly not found in liver tissue where Vitamin A (retinol) is primarily stored. Because of its importance in Vitamin A transport, STRA6 mutations are more commonly associated with problems with eye such as a reduction in retinal thickness and shortening of the inner and outer segments of rod photoreceptors. Therefore, as might be expected, STRA6 mutations result in a number of different abnormalities of the eye such as Microphthalmia, Anophthalmia, and Coloboma.

However, STRA6 is clearly vital for more than just eye development as it is expressed in many different tissues detailed above. Other disorders that result from STRA6 mutations include pulmonary dysgenesis, cardiac malformations, and mental retardation. In fact, research has shown that homozygous mutations in human STRA6 gene can lead to Matthew-Wood syndrome, which is a combination of all the mentioned disorders. In this respect, STRA6 mutations can be particularly fatal during the embryonic stage.

STRA6 has also been associated with facilitating insulin resistance. This is because STRA6 signaling results in activation of transcription factor STAT5 target genes. One of these target genes is a suppressor of cytokine signaling 3 (SOCS3) which is a strong inhibitor of insulin signaling. As a result, STRA6 signaling suppresses the response to insulin by inhibiting the phosphorylation of the insulin receptor, IR, by an influx of insulin. In other words, increased levels of the RBP in obese animals (which will increase STRA6 activity) can facilitate insulin resistance. Due to this close relationship between STRA6 and insulin resistance, it has been demonstrated that single nucleotide polymorphisms in STRA6 are associated with Type 2 Diabetes.
