= Lipocalin-2 =

Protein-coding gene in the species Homo sapiens

LCN2
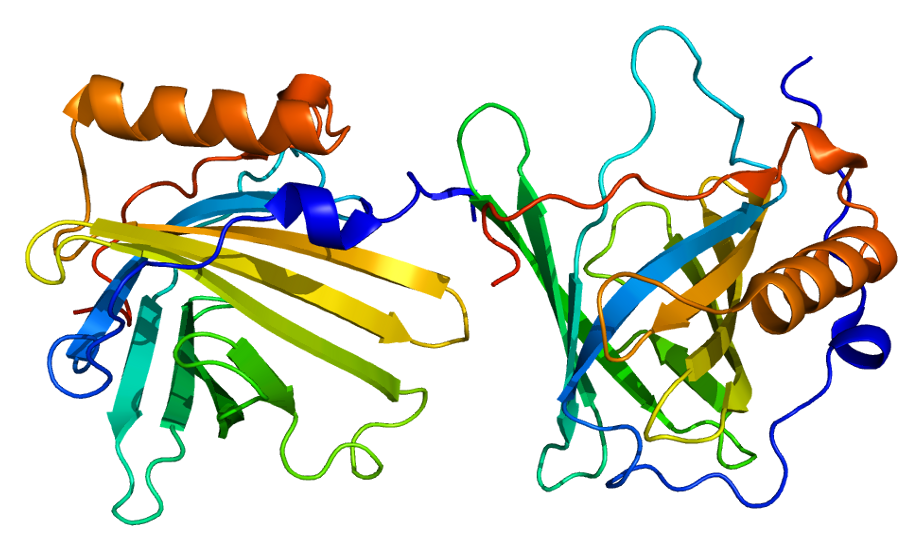

Identifiers
- Aliases: LCN2, 24p3, MSFI, NGAL, p25, lipocalin 2
- External IDs: OMIM: 600181; MGI: 96757; GeneCards: LCN2
Available structures
PDB	Ortholog search: PDBe RCSB
PDB	List of PDB id codes 1DFV, 1L6M, 1NGL, 1QQS, 1X71, 1X89, 1X8U, 3BY0, 3CBC, 3CMP, 3DSZ, 3DTQ, 3FW4, 3FW5, 3HWD, 3HWE, 3HWF, 3HWG, 3I0A, 3K3L, 3PEC, 3PED, 3T1D, 3TF6, 3TZS, 3U03, 3U0D, 4GH7, 4IAW, 4IAX, 4K19, 4MVI, 4MVK, 4MVL, 4QAE, 4ZFX, 4ZHC, 4ZHD, 4ZHF, 4ZHG, 4ZHH

Gene location (Human)
Chr.	Chromosome 9 (human)
Band	9q34.11	Start	128,149,071 bp
Band	9q34.11	End	128,153,453 bp

Gene location (Mouse)
Chr.	Chromosome 2 (mouse)
Band	2 B|2 22.09 cM	Start	32,274,645 bp
Band	2 B|2 22.09 cM	End	32,278,264 bp
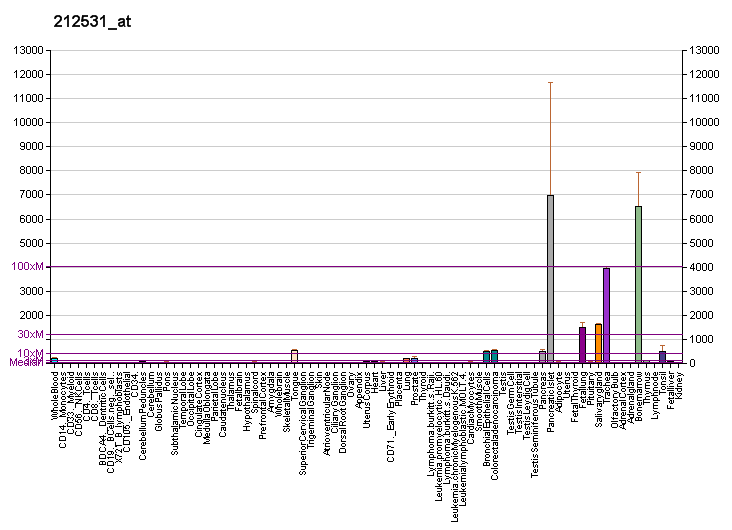
RNA expression pattern
Bgee	Human / Mouse (ortholog); Top expressed in: palpebral conjunctiva; nasal epithelium; epithelium of bronchus; bronchial epithelial cell; trabecular bone; olfactory zone of nasal mucosa; beta cell; bone marrow; gallbladder; bone marrow cell / Top expressed in: granulocyte; tibiofemoral joint; efferent ductule; olfactory epithelium; lactiferous gland; endothelial cell of lymphatic vessel; right lung lobe; ankle joint; cervix; seminiferous tubule; More reference expression data
BioGPS	More reference expression data
Gene ontology
Molecular function	transporter activity; small molecule binding; protease binding; iron ion binding; protein homodimerization activity; enterobactin binding
Cellular component	extracellular exosome; extracellular space; cytosol; specific granule lumen; extracellular region; cytoplasmic vesicle; cytoplasmic vesicle lumen
Biological process	immune system process; iron ion homeostasis; ion transport; innate immune response; cellular iron ion homeostasis; apoptotic process; response to oxidative stress; response to virus; response to bacterium; response to herbicide; response to mycotoxin; positive regulation of gene expression; siderophore transport; antimicrobial humoral response; positive regulation of cell projection organization; response to nutrient levels; cellular response to nutrient levels; neutrophil degranulation; protein homotrimerization; cellular response to hydrogen peroxide; cellular response to lipopolysaccharide; cellular response to interleukin-1; cellular response to tumor necrosis factor; extrinsic apoptotic signaling pathway in absence of ligand; transport; cytokine-mediated signaling pathway; defense response to bacterium; sequestering of iron ion; positive regulation of cold-induced thermogenesis
Sources:Amigo / QuickGO
Orthologs
Databases	NCBI: entry; OMA: entry
Species	Human	Mouse
Entrez	3934	16819
Ensembl	ENSG00000148346	ENSMUSG00000026822
UniProt	P80188	P11672
RefSeq (mRNA)	NM_005564	NM_008491
RefSeq (protein)	NP_005555	NP_032517
Location (UCSC)	Chr 9: 128.15 – 128.15 Mb	Chr 2: 32.27 – 32.28 Mb
PubMed search
- Wikidata
View/Edit Human	View/Edit Mouse

Lipocalin-2 (LCN2), also known as oncogene 24p3 or neutrophil gelatinase-associated lipocalin (NGAL), is a protein that in humans is encoded by the LCN2 gene. NGAL is involved in innate immunity by sequestering iron and preventing its use by bacteria, thus limiting their growth. It is expressed in neutrophils and in low levels in the kidney, prostate, and epithelia of the respiratory and alimentary tracts. NGAL is used as a biomarker of kidney injury.

== Function ==
The binding of NGAL to bacterial siderophores is important in the innate immune response to bacterial infection. Upon encountering invading bacteria, the toll-like receptors on immune cells stimulate the synthesis and secretion of NGAL. Secreted NGAL then limits bacterial growth by sequestering iron-containing siderophores. Lipocalin-2 binds, next to bacterial siderophores, also to the mammalian siderophore 2,5-dihydroxybenzoic acid (2,5-DHBA). This complex ensures that excess free iron does not accumulate in the cytoplasm. Mammalian cells lacking 2,5-DHBA accumulate abnormal intracellular levels of iron leading to high levels of reactive oxygen species. Lipocalin-2 also functions as a growth factor and participates in synaptic plasticity.

== Clinical significance ==
As NGAL is protease resistant and has a low molecular weight, it is excreted and detectable in urine. Injured epithelial cells in the kidney secrete a monomeric form of NGAL, whereas activated neutrophils secrete a dimeric form. It has therefore been hypothesized that classification of NGAL form could improve acute kidney injury (AKI) diagnostics, by distinguishing NGAL of inflammatory origin from that of renal origin. In AKI patients, NGAL levels are however elevated in both blood and urine within two hours of injury and plasma NGAL been shown to be predictive of dialysis need. NGAL has also been associated with chronic kidney disease, contrast induced nephropathy, kidney transplant, and mortality.

Kidney health is most frequently measured by serum creatinine. Serum creatinine is a marker of kidney function, whereas NGAL is a marker of kidney injury. NGAL levels are a more precise and sensitive marker for diagnosing AKI than serum creatinine levels. Therefore, monitoring NGAL levels reduces delayed AKI diagnosis and treatment. Using a more sensitive and specific marker allows for earlier diagnosis, correct responses to AKI, and reduced risk of morbidity and mortality.

The NGAL level measured in an individual is proportional to the severity of the AKI. Individuals positive for NGAL tend to have higher incidence of renal replacement therapy and have higher rates of in-hospital mortality, both in the presence and the absence of serum creatinine. Therefore, an individual may have AKI without the presence of serum creatinine.

The ability to diagnose AKI before acute kidney failure is financially beneficial and favorable for preventative health measures. More than 10% of people in the United States will develop some kind of chronic kidney disease (CKD), with higher incidences for individuals that suffer from obesity, elevated cholesterol, and a family history of CKD. There is no point of return once there is a significant injury to the kidney; therefore, early diagnosis of kidney injury is important for preventing AKI. Using NGAL as a biomarker can lower hospital costs because fewer patients will reach a critical stage in kidney injury. Ultimately, diagnosis of AKI with NGAL can reduce the time a patient stays in a hospital. For example, the early diagnosis of AKI with NGAL as a biomarker can help a patient avoid kidney dialysis.

LCN2 was found to be upregulated in postmortem human brains with Alzheimer's disease. Application of LCN2 to in vitro 3D human astroglia, it reduces neurogenic potential and enhances reactive states. LCN2 activity can be blocked with NGFR signaling. Reactive astrocytes also secrete inflammatory molecules such as lipocalin-2 (LCN2), which can perpetuate astrocyte reactivity and negatively influence other central nervous system cell types. In spinal cord injury, LCN2 is markedly upregulated at the lesion site, and preclinical studies targeting LCN2 have reported beneficial effects, including reduced glial scar volume, attenuated pro-inflammatory responses, and enhanced neuronal survival, making it a potential target for neurological complications associated with metabolic abnormalities, such as type 2 diabetes

== Laboratory measurement ==
Renal expression of NGAL increases in the kidneys after injury for a variety of reasons. The level of NGAL in the urine and plasma increases within 2 hours of kidney injury. It is possible to measure NGAL in serum or urine in the range of 25 to 5,000 ng/mL by current laboratory tests. Low levels for NGAL have been considered to be 200 ng/mL, medium levels 400 ng/mL, and high levels 800 ng/mL.

A study on children with pediatric cardiopulmonary bypass operations showed that urinary NGAL concentrations above 50 ng/mL 2 hours after surgery is indicative of serum creatinine levels 50% over basal values. Normally, children tend to have almost undetectable levels of NGAL. Therefore, studies that include children are considered to be “pure.” Adult patients presenting for cardiopulmonary bypass surgery are not considered to be “pure” in NGAL studies because adults often have other disorders such as inflammatory conditions, which can cause slight increases in NGAL.

AKI studies investigating the use of NGAL as a biomarker often compare serum creatinine and NGAL production. Unfortunately, serum creatinine production is variable and can reflect hemodynamic variation in the glomerular filtration rate formerly known as prerenal azotemia; therefore, the comparison is not always reliable because creatinine and NGAL measure different components of renal (dys)function. The demonstration that NGAL does not rise in the setting of transient changes in creatinine can help clinicians determine whether changes in creatinine reflect kidney damage or rather only non specific or mild functional changes in kidney function.

Lipocalin-2 (NGAL) is typically assessed for clinical or research purposes using ELISA or immunoturbidimetric assays.

Lipocalin-2 (NGAL) was approved by the US FDA (Dec 7, 2023) to detect injury leading to worsening renal function. NGAL was approved previously in Japan (2017) and Europe to detect kidney damage in patients.

== See also ==
- Lipocalin
