= RBP7 =

Protein-coding gene in humans

Identifiers
- Aliases: RBP7, CRBP4, CRBPIV, retinol binding protein 7, CRABP4
- External IDs: OMIM: 608604; MGI: 1890409; GeneCards: RBP7
Available structures
PDB	Ortholog search: PDBe RCSB
PDB	List of PDB id codes 1LPJ

Gene location (Human)
Chr.	Chromosome 1 (human)
Band	1p36.22	Start	9,997,206 bp
Band	1p36.22	End	10,016,021 bp

Gene location (Mouse)
Chr.	Chromosome 4 (mouse)
Band	4|4 E2	Start	149,534,144 bp
Band	4|4 E2	End	149,539,435 bp
RNA expression pattern
Bgee	Human / Mouse (ortholog); Top expressed in: abdominal fat; pericardium; subcutaneous adipose tissue; monocyte; spleen; apex of heart; granulocyte; vena cava; gastric mucosa; tendon of biceps brachii / Top expressed in: interventricular septum; soleus muscle; brown adipose tissue; white adipose tissue; myocardium of ventricle; muscle of thigh; right ventricle; subcutaneous adipose tissue; intercostal muscle; left ventricle; More reference expression data
BioGPS	n/a
Gene ontology
Molecular function	retinol binding; protein binding; retinoid binding; retinal binding; lipid binding
Cellular component	cytoplasm
Biological process	transport
Sources:Amigo / QuickGO
Orthologs
Databases	NCBI: entry; OMA: entry
Species	Human	Mouse
Entrez	116362	63954
Ensembl	ENSG00000162444	ENSMUSG00000028996
UniProt	Q96R05	Q9EPC5
RefSeq (mRNA)	NM_052960	NM_022020
RefSeq (protein)	NP_443192	NP_071303
Location (UCSC)	Chr 1: 10 – 10.02 Mb	Chr 4: 149.53 – 149.54 Mb
PubMed search
- Wikidata
View/Edit Human	View/Edit Mouse

Retinol binding protein 7 is a protein that in humans is encoded by the RBP7 gene.

== Function ==
The protein encoded by this gene is a member of the cellular retinol-binding protein (CRBP) family, whose members are required for vitamin A stability and metabolism. The encoded protein binds all-trans-retinol and is structurally similar to other CRBPs; however, it has a lower binding affinity for retinol than other CRBPs. [provided by RefSeq, Aug 2016].
