= Alpha-1-microglobulin/bikunin precursor =

Protein-coding gene in the species Homo sapiens

AMBP
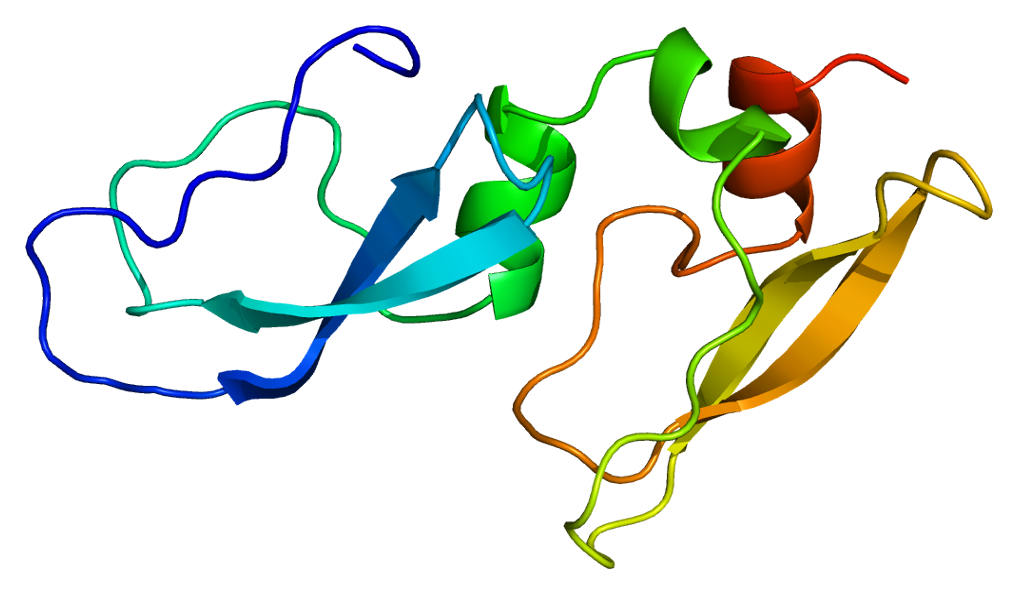
Available structures
PDB	Ortholog search: PDBe RCSB
PDB	List of PDB id codes 1BIK, 3QKG, 4ES7, 4U30

Identifiers
- Aliases: AMBP, A1M, EDC1, HCP, HI30, IATIL, ITI, ITIL, ITILC, UTI, alpha-1-microglobulin/bikunin precursor
- External IDs: OMIM: 176870; MGI: 88002; HomoloGene: 1234; GeneCards: AMBP; OMA:AMBP - orthologs

Gene location (Human)
Chr.	Chromosome 9 (human)
Band	9q32	Start	114,060,127 bp
Band	9q32	End	114,078,328 bp

Gene location (Mouse)
Chr.	Chromosome 4 (mouse)
Band	4 B3|4 33.96 cM	Start	63,061,512 bp
Band	4 B3|4 33.96 cM	End	63,073,036 bp
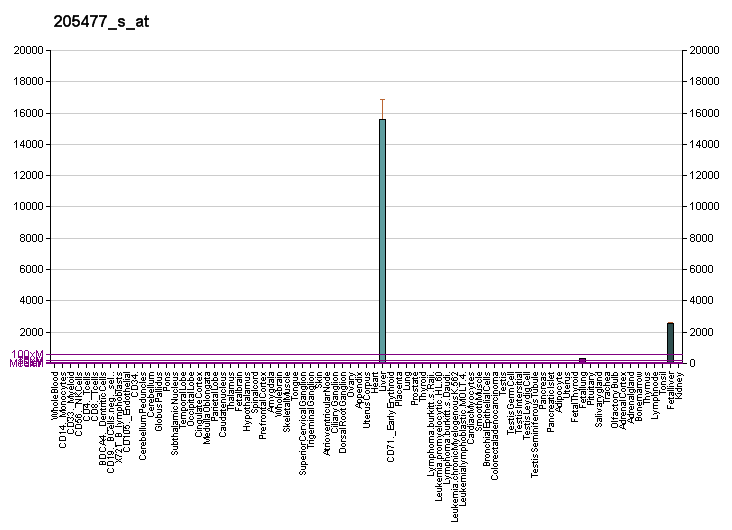
RNA expression pattern
Bgee	Human / Mouse (ortholog); Top expressed in: right lobe of liver; gallbladder; body of pancreas; islet of Langerhans; testicle; oocyte; pancreatic epithelial cell; secondary oocyte; human kidney; gonad / Top expressed in: left lobe of liver; gallbladder; fetal liver hematopoietic progenitor cell; yolk sac; human fetus; abdominal wall; right lobe of liver; islet of Langerhans; embryo; sexually immature organism; More reference expression data
BioGPS	More reference expression data
Gene ontology
Molecular function	peptidase inhibitor activity; calcium channel inhibitor activity; protein homodimerization activity; calcium oxalate binding; protein binding; heme binding; serine-type endopeptidase inhibitor activity; small molecule binding; IgA binding
Cellular component	blood microparticle; intracellular membrane-bounded organelle; plasma membrane; extracellular region; cell surface; extracellular exosome; extracellular space; extracellular matrix; collagen-containing extracellular matrix
Biological process	negative regulation of peptidase activity; female pregnancy; receptor-mediated endocytosis; negative regulation of JNK cascade; heme catabolic process; negative regulation of immune response; cell adhesion; protein catabolic process; viral process; negative regulation of endopeptidase activity
Sources:Amigo / QuickGO
Orthologs
Species	Human	Mouse
Entrez	259	11699
Ensembl	ENSG00000106927	ENSMUSG00000028356
UniProt	P02760	Q07456
RefSeq (mRNA)	NM_001633	NM_007443
RefSeq (protein)	NP_001624	NP_031469
Location (UCSC)	Chr 9: 114.06 – 114.08 Mb	Chr 4: 63.06 – 63.07 Mb
PubMed search
- Wikidata
View/Edit Human	View/Edit Mouse

Protein AMBP is a protein that in humans is encoded by the AMBP gene.

== Interactions ==
Alpha-1-microglobulin/bikunin precursor has been shown to interact with CD79A.

== See also ==
- Inter-alpha-trypsin inhibitor
- Alpha-1-microglobulin
