= CRABP1 =

Protein-coding gene in the species Homo sapiens

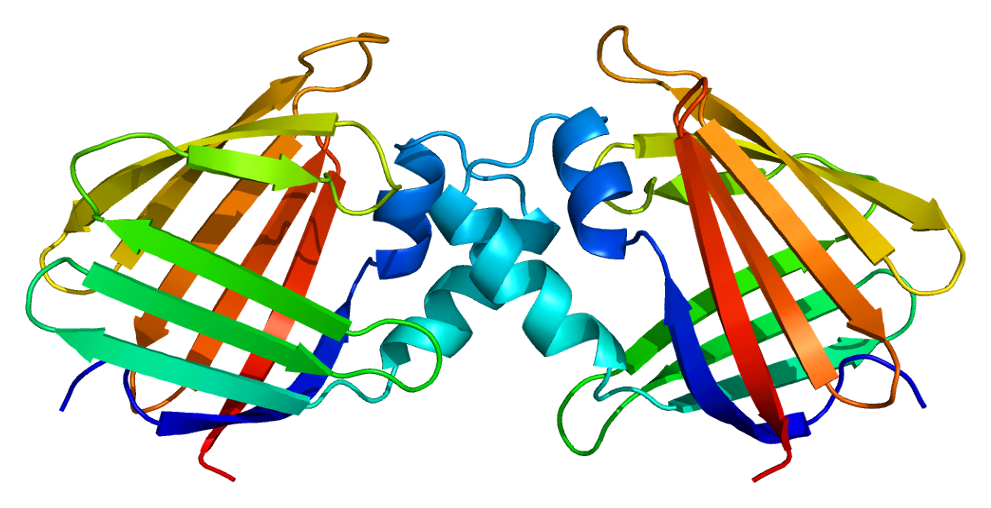

Identifiers
- Aliases: CRABP1, CRABP, CRABP-I, CRABPI, RBP5, cellular retinoic acid binding protein 1
- External IDs: OMIM: 180230; MGI: 88490; GeneCards: CRABP1

Gene location (Human)
Chr.	Chromosome 15 (human)
Band	15q25.1	Start	78,340,353 bp
Band	15q25.1	End	78,348,225 bp

Gene location (Mouse)
Chr.	Chromosome 9 (mouse)
Band	9 A5.3|9 29.76 cM	Start	54,672,032 bp
Band	9 A5.3|9 29.76 cM	End	54,680,394 bp
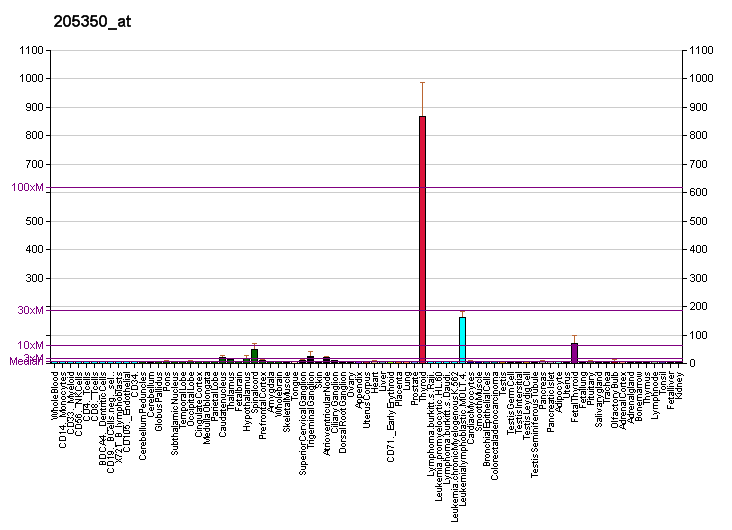
RNA expression pattern
Bgee	Human / Mouse (ortholog); Top expressed in: left lobe of thyroid gland; right lobe of thyroid gland; caudate nucleus; nucleus accumbens; middle frontal gyrus; gonad; superior vestibular nucleus; spleen; putamen; trigeminal ganglion / Top expressed in: otic placode; otic vesicle; maxillary prominence; external carotid artery; somite; desmocranium; mandibular prominence; abdominal wall; genital tubercle; internal carotid artery; More reference expression data
BioGPS	More reference expression data
Gene ontology
Molecular function	retinol binding; retinoic acid binding; protein binding; retinoid binding; retinal binding; lipid binding
Cellular component	cytoplasm; cytosol
Biological process	multicellular organism development; retinoic acid catabolic process; signal transduction
Sources:Amigo / QuickGO
Orthologs
Databases	NCBI: entry; OMA: entry
Species	Human	Mouse
Entrez	1381	12903
Ensembl	ENSG00000166426	ENSMUSG00000032291
UniProt	P29762	P62965
RefSeq (mRNA)	NM_004378	NM_001284507; NM_013496
RefSeq (protein)	NP_004369	NP_001271436; NP_038524
Location (UCSC)	Chr 15: 78.34 – 78.35 Mb	Chr 9: 54.67 – 54.68 Mb
PubMed search
- Wikidata
View/Edit Human	View/Edit Mouse

Cellular retinoic acid-binding protein 1 is a protein that in humans is encoded by the CRABP1 gene.

CRABP1 is assumed to play an important role in retinoic acid-mediated differentiation and proliferation processes. It is structurally similar to the cellular retinol-binding proteins, but binds only retinoic acid. CRABP1 is constitutively expressed and is believed to have different functions in the cell than the related CRABP2.

== Function ==
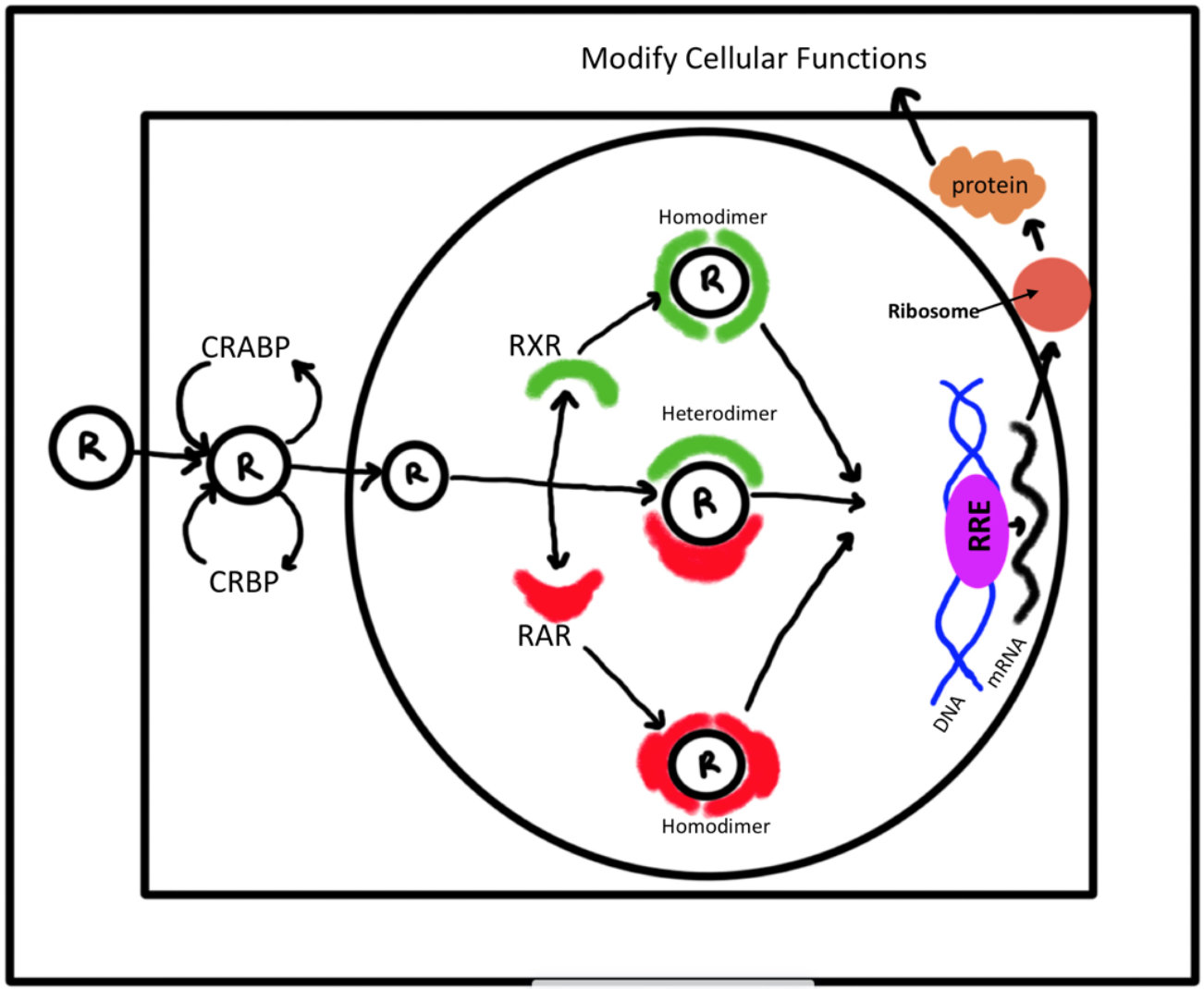
Figure 1. An overview of retinoid transfer by CRABP. R = Retinoic acid, RAR = retinoic acid receptor, RXR = Retinoic X receptor, RRE = retinoid response element. CRABP binds to retinoic acid and transports it to the nucleus where binding with RAR or RXR homodimers or heterodimers further regulates RREs to regulate transcription events on DNA.

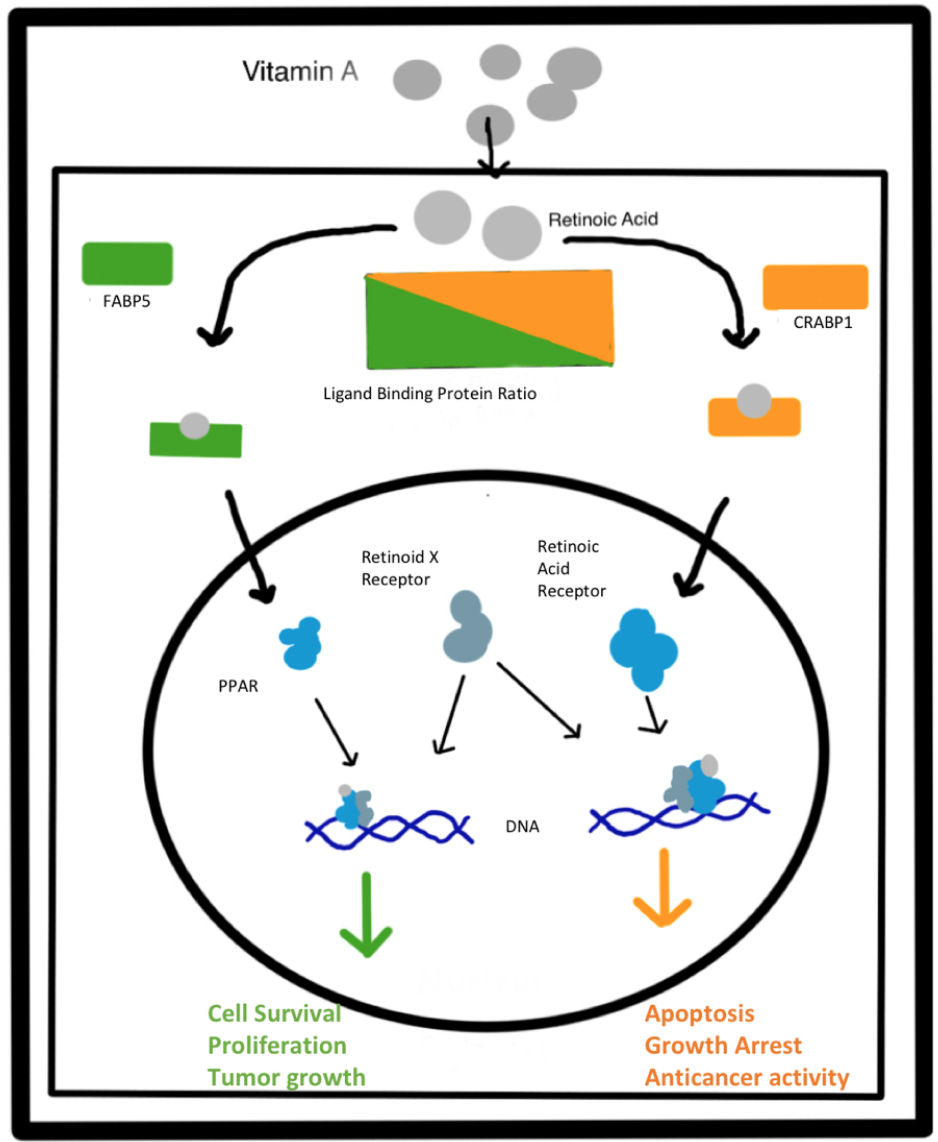
Figure 2. Retinoic acid (RA) is processed from vitamin A to bind to fatty acid binding protein (FABP5) along with CRABP to associate with the binding to DNA to mediate pathways. RA binds with CRABP to mediate further action with retinoic acid receptor (RAR) on DNA for pathway mediation as well.

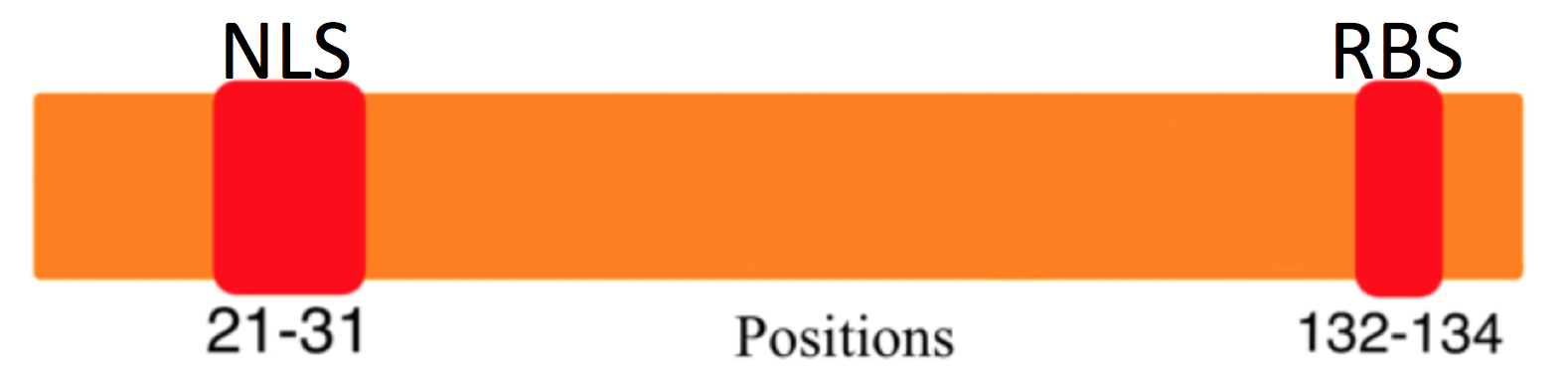
Figure 3. Image of the domain locations for CRABP1. The nuclear localization signal (NLS) is at position 21-31 and the retinoic acid binding site (RBS) is at position 132-134.

CRABP1 binds to retinoid acid and helps to transport it into the nucleus (Figure 1). Both CRABP1 and CRABP2 perform this activity. The retinoic acid molecule is then released and further bound to retinoic acid receptor (RAR) and the retinoid X receptor (RXR) as homodimers or heterodimers. This complex then further binds to retinoic acid response elements (RARE) on DNA that regulates transcription of retinoid acid dependent null genes. The domains for the nuclear localization and the retinoic acid binding are shown in Figure 3.

CRABP1 has been found to be involved in multiple cancer proliferation pathways. CRABP1 activates the extracellular signal-regulated kinase, ERK1 and ERK2 kinases, which are involved in the cell cycle. CRABP1 activity can thus extend the cell cycle, e.g. in embryonic and neural stem cells. Knockout mice without CRABP1 showed increased neural stem cell proliferation and thus hippocampus neurogenesis. Furthermore, learning and memory were improved in knockout mice, as measured by the Morris water maze test and an object recognition task.

CRABP1 is also involved in cancer cell apoptosis. trans-retinoic acid was considered a [null therapeutic target for cancer] as a ligand of CRABP1. It was observed that CRABP1 regulated ERK1/2) which in turn activates the protein phosphatase 2A (PP2A) that induces apoptosis of cancer cells and lengthens the cell cycle of embryonic stem cells. PP2A activity promotes the stem cells renewal ability during the differentiation process. When CRABP1 was knocked down the apoptotic induction ability was also removed and allowed for cell proliferation. The re-expression of CRABP1 in CRABP1 null cells brought back the induced apoptotic activity. Thus CRABP1 may be used as a therapeutic target along with trans-retinoic acid for apoptotic activity within cancer cells. Figure 2 illustrates both pathways of retinoic acid binding to CRABP for cell proliferation and apoptotic activity.
