= CRABP2 =

Protein-coding gene in humans

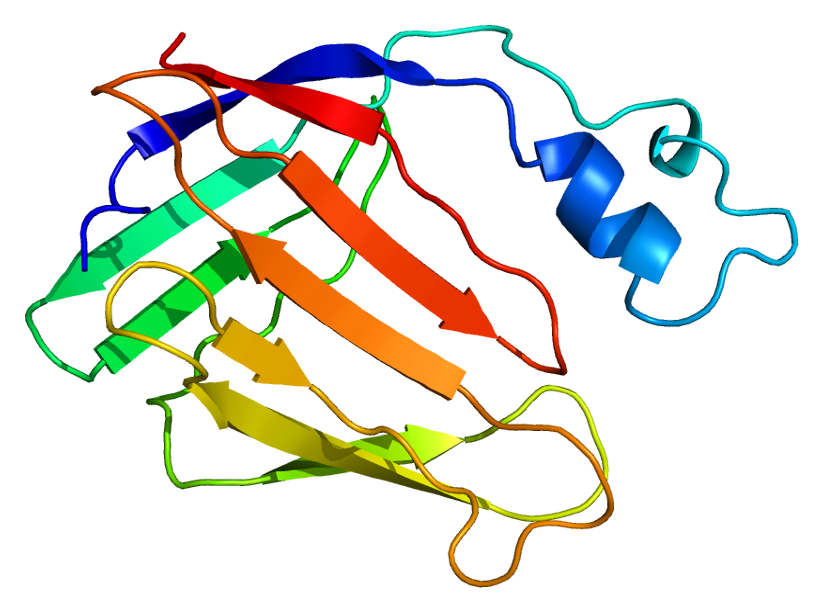

Identifiers
- Aliases: CRABP2, CRABP-II, RBP6, cellular retinoic acid binding protein 2
- External IDs: OMIM: 180231; MGI: 88491; GeneCards: CRABP2
Available structures
PDB	Ortholog search: PDBe RCSB
PDB	List of PDB id codes 1BLR, 1BM5, 1CBQ, 1CBS, 1XCA, 2CBS, 2FR3, 2FRS, 2FS6, 2FS7, 2G78, 2G79, 2G7B, 3CBS, 3CR6, 3CWK, 3D95, 3D96, 3D97, 3F8A, 3F9D, 3FA6, 3FA7, 3FA8, 3FA9, 3FEK, 3FEL, 3FEN, 3FEP, 3I17, 4I9R, 4I9S, 4M6S, 4M7M, 4QGV, 4QGW, 4QGX, 4YBP, 4YBU, 4YKM, 4YKO, 4YCH, 4YGZ, 4YFP, 4YFQ, 4YGH, 4YH0, 4YFR, 4YCE, 4YGG, 4YDA, 4YDB, 5HZQ

Gene location (Human)
Chr.	Chromosome 1 (human)
Band	1q23.1	Start	156,699,606 bp
Band	1q23.1	End	156,705,816 bp

Gene location (Mouse)
Chr.	Chromosome 3 (mouse)
Band	3 F1|3	Start	87,855,973 bp
Band	3 F1|3	End	87,860,683 bp
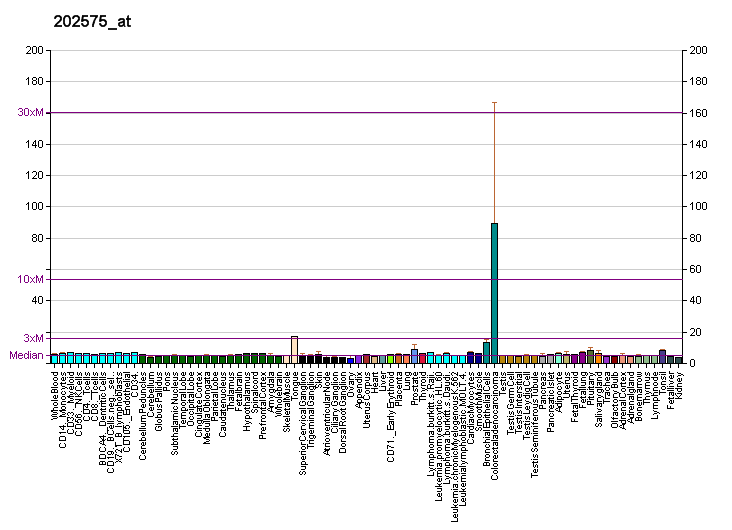
RNA expression pattern
Bgee	Human / Mouse (ortholog); Top expressed in: gums; gingival epithelium; vulva; oral cavity; skin of abdomen; mucosa of pharynx; skin of limb; skin of leg; skin of arm; vagina / Top expressed in: somite; maxillary prominence; hand; neural ectoderm; mandibular prominence; otic placode; esophagus; lip; otic vesicle; primitive streak; More reference expression data
BioGPS	More reference expression data
Gene ontology
Molecular function	transporter activity; lipid binding; retinol binding; retinoic acid binding; protein binding; retinal binding; retinoid binding
Cellular component	extracellular exosome; endoplasmic reticulum; nucleus; nucleoplasm; cytoplasm; cytosol
Biological process	regulation of transcription, DNA-templated; positive regulation of collateral sprouting; retinoic acid metabolic process; embryonic forelimb morphogenesis; signal transduction; regulation of retinoic acid receptor signaling pathway; epidermis development; retinoic acid biosynthetic process; transport
Sources:Amigo / QuickGO
Orthologs
Databases	NCBI: entry; OMA: entry
Species	Human	Mouse
Entrez	1382	12904
Ensembl	ENSG00000143320	ENSMUSG00000004885
UniProt	P29373	P22935
RefSeq (mRNA)	NM_001878; NM_001199723	NM_007759
RefSeq (protein)	NP_001186652; NP_001869	NP_031785
Location (UCSC)	Chr 1: 156.7 – 156.71 Mb	Chr 3: 87.86 – 87.86 Mb
PubMed search
- Wikidata
View/Edit Human	View/Edit Mouse

Cellular retinoic acid-binding protein 2 is a cytoplasmic binding protein that in humans is encoded by the CRABP2 gene.

CRABP2 is structurally similar to CRABP1, but CRABP2 has a lower affinity for retinoic acid (RA). CRABP2 is associated with cells that produce large amounts of retinoic acid and may play a role in mediating the effects of retinoic acid in the cell.

== Function ==
A number of specific carrier proteins for members of the vitamin A family have been discovered. Retinoic acid is an active metabolite of vitamin A (retinol). Cellular retinoic acid binding proteins (CRABP) are low molecular weight proteins whose precise function remains largely unknown.

The inducibility of the CRABP2 gene suggests that this isoform is important in retinoic acid-mediated regulation of human skin growth, differentiation and development. CRABP2 is involved in the metabolism and transportation of retinoic acid from the cytosol to the RARs (retinoic acid receptors) located in the nucleus. CRABP2 is specifically co-expressed with RAR-β and cellular retinol binding protein 1 genes in certain tissues. It has been postulated that the CRABP2 gene is transcriptionally regulated by a newly synthesized regulatory protein.

== Tissue distribution ==
Tissue distribution of the CRABP2 gene has primarily been studied using mouse models. During embryonic development, CRABP2 is present in tissues throughout the body in a more diffuse pattern than CRABP1. CRABP1 is more isolated to specific regions, though it does appear in higher concentrations. CRABP1 and 2 often overlap in tissues.

CRABP2 gene expression is abundant in the trunk and hindbrain (and to a lesser extent the forebrain), but are present in other areas of the body. Structures such as the limbs, hindbrain and cranial neural crest cells have been shown to be excessively sensitive to high levels of retinoic acid. Rhombomere segmentation in the hindbrain and the development of cranial ganglia V, VII, VIII, IX, and X also appear to be partially dependent on CRABP2 expression. CRABP2 is abundant in the dorsal part of the limb during development.

CRABP2 genes are also expressed in structures that are less sensitive to retinoid levels throughout the body during embryonic development. These structures include the pharyngeal pouches, foregut, midgut, mandibular and frontal mesenchyme, developing muscle, interdigital mesenchyme, the urogenital system, optic vessels, and inner ear sensory epithelium.

== Defects ==
Vitamin A deficiency in mice has been shown to cause problems with spermatogenesis, irregular estrous cycles, changes in the uterine epithelium and reproductive failure ending with fetal death and reabsorption.

Tissues with CRABP2 can be sensitive to high levels of retinoic acid which may cause defects in the development of those tissues.

Mice with the GRABP2 gene deactivated had polydactyly 45% of the time, but otherwise were "essentially normal".

== Interactions ==
CRABP2 has been shown to interact with Cyclin D3.
