= RBP2 =

Protein-coding gene in humans

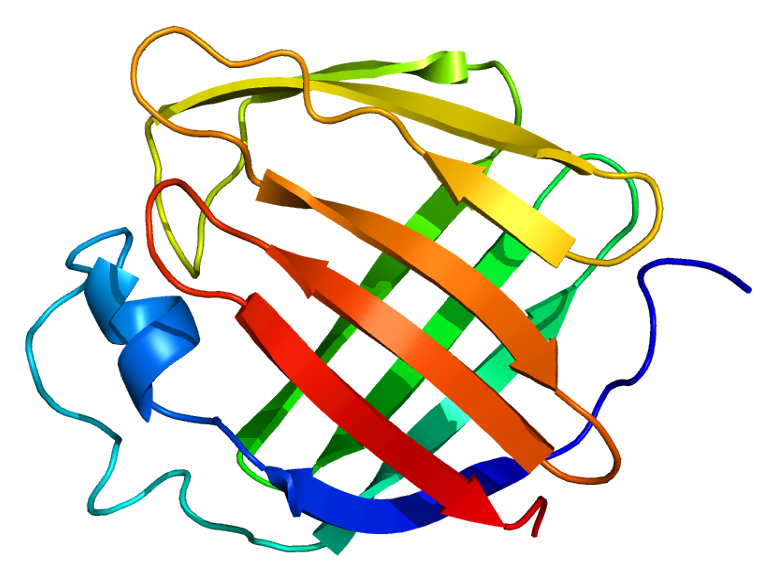

Identifiers
- Aliases: RBP2, CRABP-II, CCRBPII, RBPC2, retinol binding protein 2
- External IDs: OMIM: 180280; MGI: 97877; GeneCards: RBP2
Available structures
PDB	Ortholog search: PDBe RCSB
PDB	List of PDB id codes 2RCQ, 2RCT, 4EDE, 4EEJ, 4EFG, 4EXZ, 4GKC, 4QYN, 4QYP, 4QZT, 4QZU, 4RUU, 4ZGU, 4ZH9, 4ZCB, 4ZH6, 4ZJ0, 4ZR2

Gene location (Human)
Chr.	Chromosome 3 (human)
Band	3q23	Start	139,452,884 bp
Band	3q23	End	139,480,747 bp

Gene location (Mouse)
Chr.	Chromosome 9 (mouse)
Band	9 E3.3|9 51.37 cM	Start	98,368,168 bp
Band	9 E3.3|9 51.37 cM	End	98,391,834 bp
RNA expression pattern
Bgee	Human / Mouse (ortholog); Top expressed in: jejunal mucosa; mucosa of ileum; duodenum; buccal mucosa cell; testicle; right lung; amniotic fluid; right uterine tube; mucosa of transverse colon; upper lobe of left lung / Top expressed in: duodenum; esophagus; pyloric antrum; jejunum; ileum; lip; mucous cell of stomach; yolk sac; migratory enteric neural crest cell; corneal stroma; More reference expression data
BioGPS	n/a
Gene ontology
Molecular function	lipid binding; retinol binding; retinoid binding; retinal binding
Cellular component	cytoplasm; cytosol
Biological process	retinoid metabolic process; epidermis development; vitamin A metabolic process; transport
Sources:Amigo / QuickGO
Orthologs
Databases	NCBI: entry; OMA: entry
Species	Human	Mouse
Entrez	5948	19660
Ensembl	ENSG00000114113	ENSMUSG00000032454
UniProt	P50120	Q08652
RefSeq (mRNA)	NM_004164	NM_009034
RefSeq (protein)	NP_004155	NP_033060
Location (UCSC)	Chr 3: 139.45 – 139.48 Mb	Chr 9: 98.37 – 98.39 Mb
PubMed search
- Wikidata
View/Edit Human	View/Edit Mouse

Retinol-binding protein 2 (RBP2) is a protein that in humans is encoded by the RBP2 gene.

== Function ==
RBP2 is an abundant protein present in the small intestinal epithelium. It is thought to participate in the uptake and/or intracellular metabolism of vitamin A. Vitamin A is a fat-soluble vitamin necessary for growth, reproduction, differentiation of epithelial tissues, and vision. RBP2 may also modulate the supply of retinoic acid to the nuclei of endometrial cells during the menstrual cycle.
