= Autonomic nervous system =

Division of the nervous system supplying internal organs, smooth muscle and glands

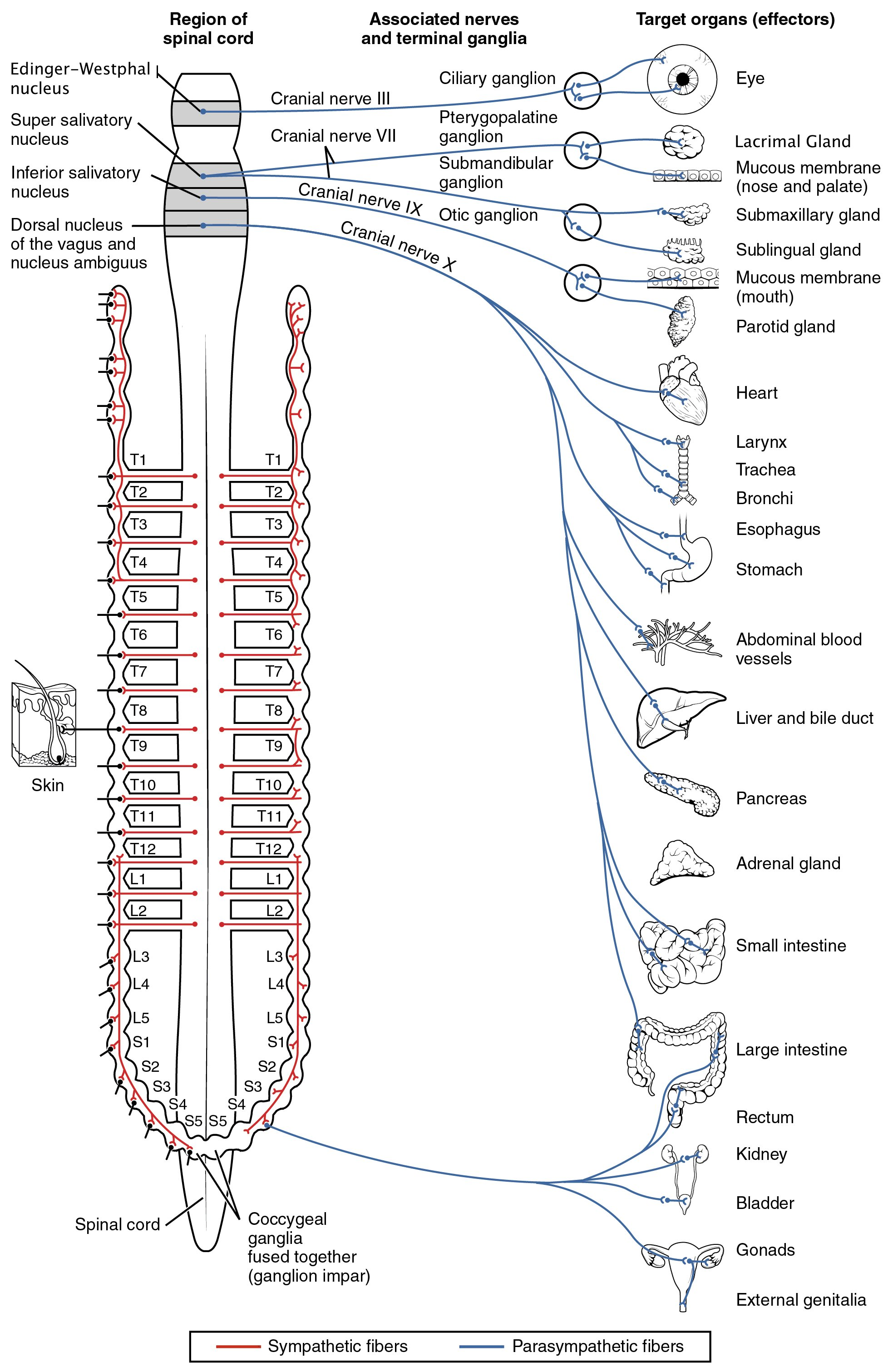
- Autonomic nervous system innervation

Details

Identifiers
- Latin: autonomicum systema nervosum
- MeSH: D001341
- TA98: A14.3.00.001
- TA2: 6600
- FMA: 9905

The autonomic nervous system (ANS), sometimes called the visceral nervous system and formerly the vegetative nervous system, is a division of the nervous system that operates internal organs, smooth muscle and glands. The autonomic nervous system is a control system that acts largely unconsciously and regulates bodily functions, such as the heart rate, its force of contraction, digestion, respiratory rate, pupillary response, urination, and sexual arousal. The autonomic nervous system has historically been branched into three divisions based on which organs and functions are being controlled by each system. This includes the enteric nervous system, which regulates the gastrointestinal tract, the parasympathetic nervous system and the sympathetic nervous system, which are responsible for, among other things, stimulation of the "rest and digest" and the fight-or-flight response (or "acute stress response"), respectively. In literature, the acronyms ENS, PSNS and SNS or SANS(where the A stands for autonomic) may be used to abbreviate the aforementioned terms.

ANS is regulated by integrated reflexes through the brainstem to the spinal cord and organs. These functions include control of respiration, cardiac regulation, vasomotor activity, and certain reflex actions such as coughing, sneezing, swallowing and vomiting. Those are then subdivided into other areas and are also linked to autonomic subsystems and the peripheral nervous system. The hypothalamus, just above the brain stem, acts as an integrator for autonomic functions, receiving autonomic regulatory input from the limbic system. The vagus nerve plays a key role in the functioning of ANS, being the longest nerve of this system, and with both sensory and motor fibers, it helps with control over unconscious functions.

Although conflicting reports about its subdivisions exist in the literature, the autonomic nervous system has historically been considered a purely motor system, and has been divided into the aforementioned three branches of ENS, PSNS and SANS. The enteric nervous system however is a less recognized part of the autonomic nervous system. When it comes to the parasympathetic(calm, digesting, mating) and the sympathetic(acute stress), in many cases, the two of these systems have complementary actions where one system activates a physiological response and the other inhibits it. An older simplification of the sympathetic and parasympathetic nervous systems as "excitatory" and "inhibitory" was overturned due to the many exceptions found. A more modern characterization is that the sympathetic nervous system is a "quick response mobilizing system" and the parasympathetic is a "more slowly activated dampening system", but even this has exceptions, such as in sexual arousal and orgasm, wherein both play a role.

There are inhibitory and excitatory synapses between neurons. A third subsystem of neurons has been named as non-noradrenergic, non-cholinergic transmitters because they use other transmitters such as nitric oxide as a neurotransmitter. These functions are integral in autonomic function, in particular in the gut and the lungs.

Although the ANS is also known as the visceral nervous system and although most of its fibers carry non-somatic information to the CNS, many authors still consider it only connected with the motor side. Most autonomous functions are involuntary but they can often work in conjunction with the somatic nervous system which provides voluntary control. Overall, the ANS ensures the maintenance of vital functions and allows the body to effectively adapt to cycles of stress and recovery.

== Structure ==
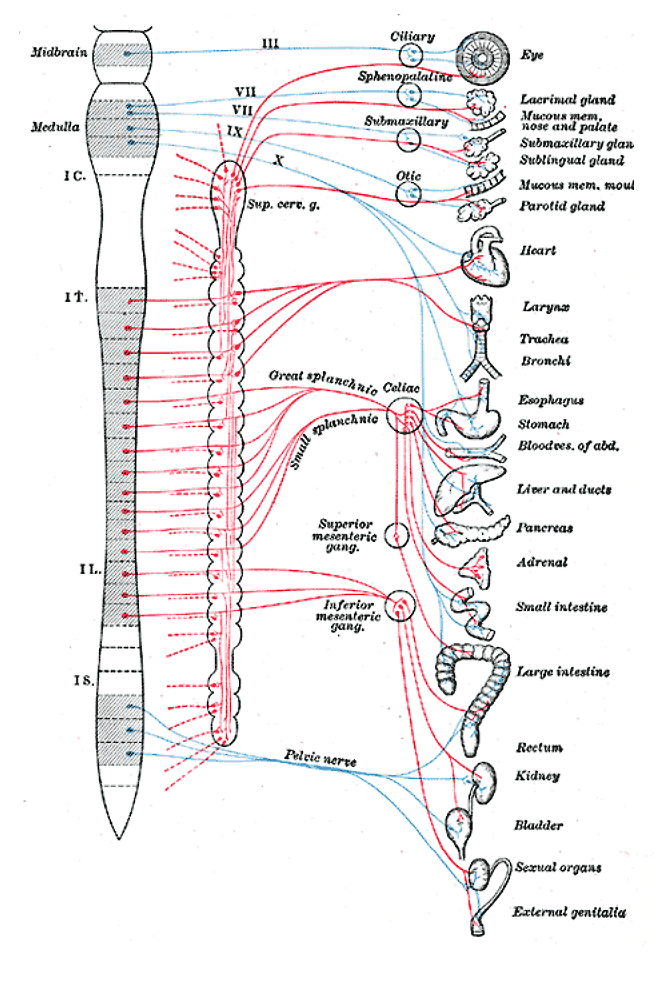
Autonomic nervous system, showing splanchnic nerves in middle, and the vagus nerve as "X" in blue. The heart and organs below in list to right are regarded as viscera.

The autonomic nervous system has been classically divided into the sympathetic, parasympathetic and enteric nervous systems. More modern classifications recognize other networks that are integral to different organs, such as the intrinsic cardiac nervous system.

The sympathetic division emerges from the spinal cord in the thoracic and lumbar areas, terminating around L2-3. The parasympathetic division has craniosacral "outflow", meaning that the neurons begin at the cranial nerves (specifically the oculomotor nerve, facial nerve, glossopharyngeal nerve and vagus nerve) and sacral (S2-S4) spinal cord. These divisions are distinctive because they require a sequential two-neuron efferent pathway; the preganglionic neuron must first synapse onto a postganglionic neuron before innervating the target organ. The preganglionic, or first, neuron will have its nerve cell body in the central nervous system and will synapse at the postganglionic, or second, neuron's cell body. The postganglionic neuron will then form junctions within the target organ.

=== Sympathetic division ===
The sympathetic nervous system consists of cells with bodies in the lateral grey column from T1 to L2/3. These cell bodies are "GVE" (general visceral efferent) neurons and are the preganglionic neurons. There are several locations upon which preganglionic neurons can synapse for their postganglionic neurons:

- paravertebral ganglia (3) of the sympathetic chain (these run on either side of the vertebral bodies)
1. cervical ganglia (3)
2. thoracic ganglia (12) and rostral lumbar ganglia (2 or 3)
3. caudal lumbar ganglia and sacral ganglia
- prevertebral ganglia (celiac ganglion, aorticorenal ganglion, superior mesenteric ganglion, inferior mesenteric ganglion)
- chromaffin cells of the adrenal medulla (this is the one exception to the two-neuron pathway rule: the synapse is directly efferent onto the target cell bodies)

These ganglia provide the postganglionic neurons from which innervation of target organs follows. Examples of splanchnic (visceral) nerves are:

- cervical cardiac nerves and thoracic visceral nerves, which synapse in the sympathetic chain
- thoracic splanchnic nerves (greater, lesser, least), which synapse in the prevertebral ganglia
- lumbar splanchnic nerves, which synapse in the prevertebral ganglia
- sacral splanchnic nerves, which synapse in the inferior hypogastric plexus

These all contain afferent (sensory) nerves as well, known as GVA (general visceral afferent) neurons.

=== Parasympathetic division ===
The parasympathetic nervous system consists of cells with bodies in one of two locations: the brainstem (cranial nerves III, VII, IX, X) or the sacral spinal cord (S2, S3, S4). These are the preganglionic neurons, which synapse with postganglionic neurons in these locations:

- parasympathetic ganglia of the head: ciliary (cranial nerve III), geniculate (cranial nerve VII),
- pterygopalatine (cranial nerve VII and IX), and submandibular (cranial nerve VII and IX),
- ottic in inner ear space (cranial nerve IX)
- tympanic nerve of VII with C9, C10, C5 (cranial nerves VII, XI, X, V) in promontory plexus in middle ear space
- trigeminal ganglion specially sensory (only mastication motor) is common with other ones
- in or near the wall of an organ innervated by the vagus (cranial nerve X) or sacral nerves plexus (S2, S3, S4)

These ganglia provide the postganglionic neurons from which innervations of target organs follows. Examples are:

- the postganglionic parasympathetic splanchnic (visceral) nerves
- the vagus nerve, which passes through the thorax and abdominal regions innervating, among other organs, the heart, lungs, liver and stomach

=== Enteric nervous system ===
==== Development of the enteric nervous system ====
Development of the enteric nervous system involves migration of cells from the vagal section of the neural crest, eventually populating the entire gastrointestinal tract. Throughout development, tyrosine kinase activity has roles in formation and regulation of enteric ganglia to influence spontaneous, rhythmic, slow waves in the gastrointestinal tract.

==== Structure of the enteric nervous system ====
The enteric nervous system (ENS) is a division of the autonomic nervous system embedded in the gastrointestinal tract walls. Having about 200 million neurons, the ENS communicates with the central nervous system while regulating gut function independently. The core of this structure consists of two main interconnected neural networks or plexuses: the myenteric plexus (Auerbach's) and the submucosal plexus (Meissner's). The myenteric plexus extends the full length of the gut, primarily controlling motility (movement) and secretomotor functions, using nitric oxide to regulate smooth muscle in the ENS. The submucosal plexus has a role in secretory regulation by innervating intestinal endocrine cells and blood vessels.

=== Intrinsic cardiac nervous system ===
The Intrinsic cardiac nervous system (ICNS), also known as the heart's "little brain," is a complex network of neurons and ganglia embedded within the heart tissue that regulates cardiac function independently of the central nervous system. It modulates heart rate, conduction, and cardiac contractility in response to local and external stimuli. It forms part of the autonomic nervous system.

=== Sensory neurons ===
The visceral sensory system - technically not a part of the autonomic nervous system - is composed of primary neurons located in cranial sensory ganglia: the geniculate, petrosal and nodose ganglia, appended respectively to cranial nerves VII, IX and X. These sensory neurons monitor the levels of carbon dioxide, oxygen and sugar in the blood, arterial pressure and the chemical composition of the stomach and gut content. They also convey the sense of taste and smell, which, unlike most functions of the ANS, is a conscious perception. Blood oxygen and carbon dioxide are in fact directly sensed by the carotid body, a small collection of chemosensors at the bifurcation of the carotid artery, innervated by the petrosal (IXth) ganglion. Primary sensory neurons project (synapse) onto "second order" visceral sensory neurons located in the medulla oblongata, forming the nucleus of the solitary tract (nTS), that integrates all visceral information. The nTS also receives input from a nearby chemosensory center, the area postrema, that detects toxins in the blood and the cerebrospinal fluid and is essential for chemically induced vomiting or conditional taste aversion (the memory that ensures that an animal that has been poisoned by a food never touches it again). All this visceral sensory information constantly and unconsciously modulates the activity of the motor neurons of the ANS.

=== Innervation ===
Autonomic nerves travel to organs throughout the body. Most organs receive parasympathetic supply by the vagus nerve and sympathetic supply by splanchnic nerves. The sensory part of the latter reaches the spinal column at certain spinal segments. Pain in any internal organ is perceived as referred pain, more specifically as pain from the dermatome corresponding to the spinal segment.

Autonomic nervous system's jurisdiction to organs in the human body
Organ	Nerves	Spinal column origin
stomach	PS: anterior and posterior vagal trunks; S: greater splanchnic nerves	T5, T6, T7, T8, T9, sometimes T10
duodenum	PS: vagus nerves; S: greater splanchnic nerves	T5, T6, T7, T8, T9, sometimes T10
jejunum and ileum	PS: posterior vagal trunks; S: greater splanchnic nerves	T5, T6, T7, T8, T9
spleen	S: greater splanchnic nerves	T6, T7, T8
gallbladder and liver	PS: vagus nerve; S: celiac plexus; right phrenic nerve	T6, T7, T8, T9
colon	PS: vagus nerves and pelvic splanchnic nerves; S: lesser and least splanchnic nerves	T10, T11, T12 (proximal colon); L1, L2, L3, (distal colon)
pancreatic head	PS: vagus nerves; S: thoracic splanchnic nerves	T8, T9
appendix	nerves to superior mesenteric plexus	T10
bladder	PS: pelvic splanchnic nerves to detrusor muscles; S: inferior hypogastric nerves	S2-S4
kidneys and ureters	PS: vagus nerve; S: thoracic and lumbar splanchnic nerves	T11, T12

=== Motor neurons ===
Motor neurons of the autonomic nervous system are found in "autonomic ganglia". Those of the parasympathetic branch are located close to the target organ whilst the ganglia of the sympathetic branch are located close to the spinal cord.

The sympathetic ganglia here, are found in two chains: the pre-vertebral and pre-aortic chains. The activity of autonomic ganglionic neurons is modulated by "preganglionic neurons" located in the central nervous system. Preganglionic sympathetic neurons are located in the spinal cord, at the thorax and upper lumbar levels. Preganglionic parasympathetic neurons are found in the medulla oblongata where they form visceral motor nuclei; the dorsal motor nucleus of the vagus nerve; the nucleus ambiguus, the salivatory nuclei, and in the sacral region of the spinal cord.

== Function ==
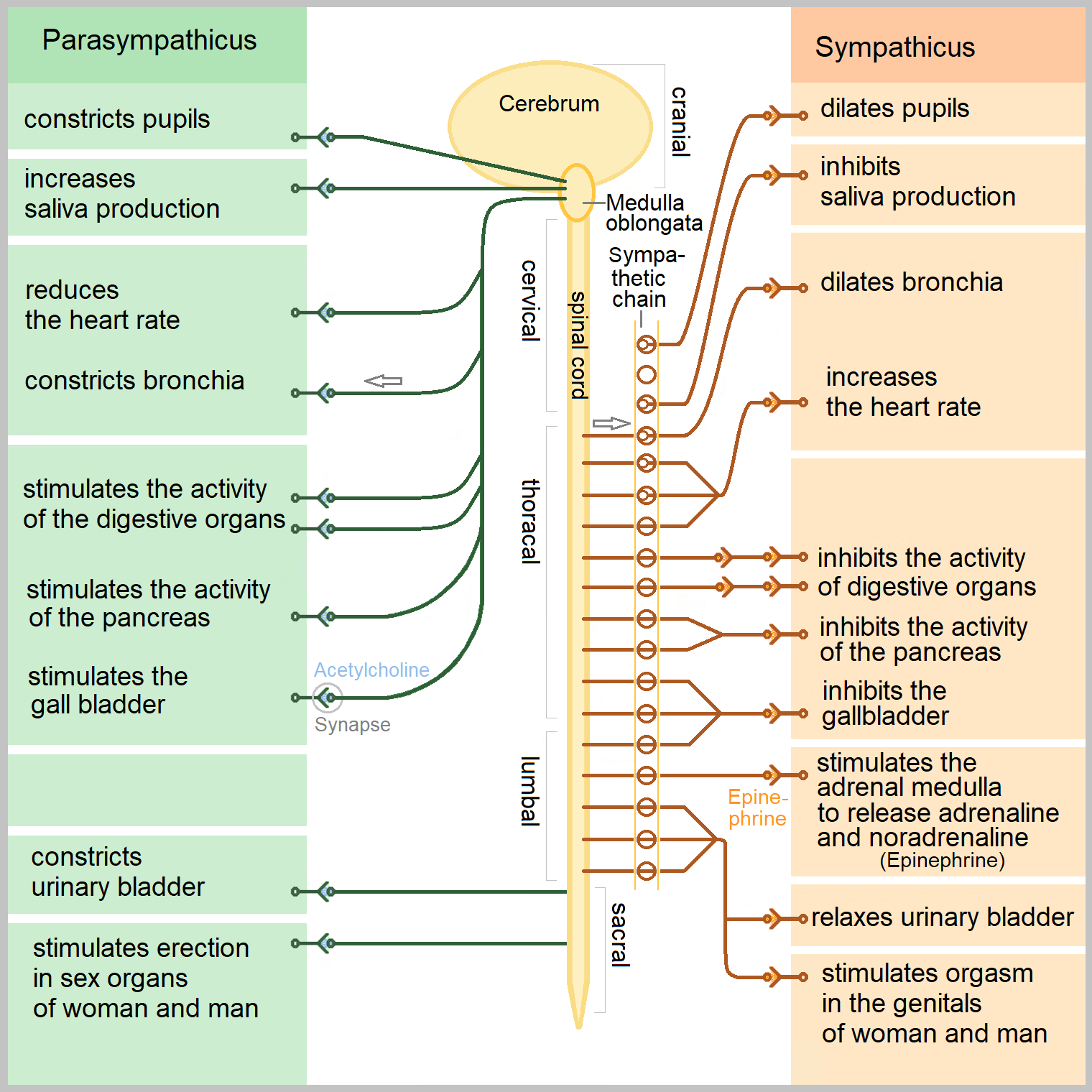
Function of the autonomic nervous system

Sympathetic and parasympathetic divisions typically function in opposition to each other. But this opposition is better termed complementary in nature rather than antagonistic. For an analogy, one may think of the sympathetic division as the accelerator and the parasympathetic division as the brake. The sympathetic division typically functions in actions requiring quick responses. The parasympathetic division functions with actions that do not require immediate reaction. The sympathetic system is often considered the "fight or flight" system, while the parasympathetic system is often considered the "rest and digest" or "feed and breed" system.

However, many instances of sympathetic and parasympathetic activity cannot be ascribed to "fight" or "rest" situations. For example, standing up from a reclining or sitting position would entail an unsustainable drop in blood pressure if not for a compensatory increase in the arterial sympathetic tonus. Another example is the constant, second-to-second, modulation of heart rate by sympathetic and parasympathetic influences, as a function of the respiratory cycles. In general, these two systems should be seen as permanently modulating vital functions, in a usually antagonistic fashion, to achieve homeostasis. Higher organisms maintain their integrity via homeostasis which relies on negative feedback regulation which, in turn, typically depends on the autonomic nervous system. Some typical actions of the sympathetic and parasympathetic nervous systems are listed below.

Target organ/system	Parasympathetic	Sympathetic
Digestive system	Increase peristalsis and amount of secretion by digestive glands	Decrease activity of digestive system
Liver	No effect	Causes glucose to be released to blood
Lungs	Constricts bronchioles	Dilates bronchioles
Urinary bladder and Urethra	Relaxes sphincter	Constricts sphincter
Kidneys	No effects	Decrease urine output
Heart	Decreases rate	Increase rate
Blood vessels	No effect on most blood vessels	Constricts blood vessels in viscera; increase BP
Salivary and lacrimal glands	Stimulates; increases production of saliva and tears	Inhibits; result in dry mouth and dry eyes
Eye (iris)	Stimulates constrictor muscles; constrict pupils	Stimulate dilator muscle; dilates pupils
Eye (ciliary muscles)	Stimulates to increase bulging of lens for close vision	Inhibits; decrease bulging of lens; prepares for distant vision
Adrenal medulla	No effect	Stimulate medulla cells to secrete epinephrine and norepinephrine
Sweat gland of skin	No effect	Stimulate sudomotor function to produce perspiration

=== Sympathetic nervous system ===
Promotes a fight-or-flight response, corresponds with arousal and energy generation, and inhibits digestion

- Diverts blood flow away from the gastro-intestinal (GI) tract and skin via vasoconstriction
- Blood flow to skeletal muscles and the lungs is enhanced (by as much as 1200% in the case of skeletal muscles)
- Dilates bronchioles of the lung through circulating epinephrine, which allows for greater alveolar oxygen exchange
- Increases heart rate and the contractility of cardiac cells (myocytes), thereby providing a mechanism for enhanced blood flow to skeletal muscles
- Dilates pupils and relaxes the ciliary muscle to the lens, allowing more light to enter the eye and enhances far vision
- Provides vasodilation for the coronary vessels of the heart
- Constricts all the intestinal sphincters and the urinary sphincter
- Inhibits peristalsis
- Stimulates orgasm

The pattern of innervation of the sweat gland—namely, the postganglionic sympathetic nerve fibers—allows clinicians and researchers to use sudomotor function testing to assess dysfunction of the autonomic nervous systems, through electrochemical skin conductance.

=== Parasympathetic nervous system ===
The parasympathetic nervous system has been said to promote a "rest and digest" response, promotes calming of the nerves return to regular function, and enhancing digestion. Functions of nerves within the parasympathetic nervous system include:

- Dilating blood vessels leading to the GI tract, increasing the blood flow.
- Constricting the bronchiolar diameter when the need for oxygen has diminished
- Dedicated cardiac branches of the vagus and thoracic spinal accessory nerves impart parasympathetic control of the heart (myocardium)
- Constriction of the pupil and contraction of the ciliary muscles, facilitating accommodation and allowing for closer vision
- Stimulating salivary gland secretion, and accelerates peristalsis, mediating digestion of food and, indirectly, the absorption of nutrients
- Sexual. Nerves of the peripheral nervous system are involved in the erection of genital tissues via the pelvic splanchnic nerves 2–4. They are also responsible for stimulating sexual arousal.

=== Enteric nervous system ===
The enteric nervous system is the intrinsic nervous system of the gastrointestinal system. It has been described as the "second brain of the human body". Its functions include:

- Sensing chemical and mechanical changes in the gut
- Regulating secretions in the gut
- Controlling peristalsis and some other movements

=== Neurotransmitters ===
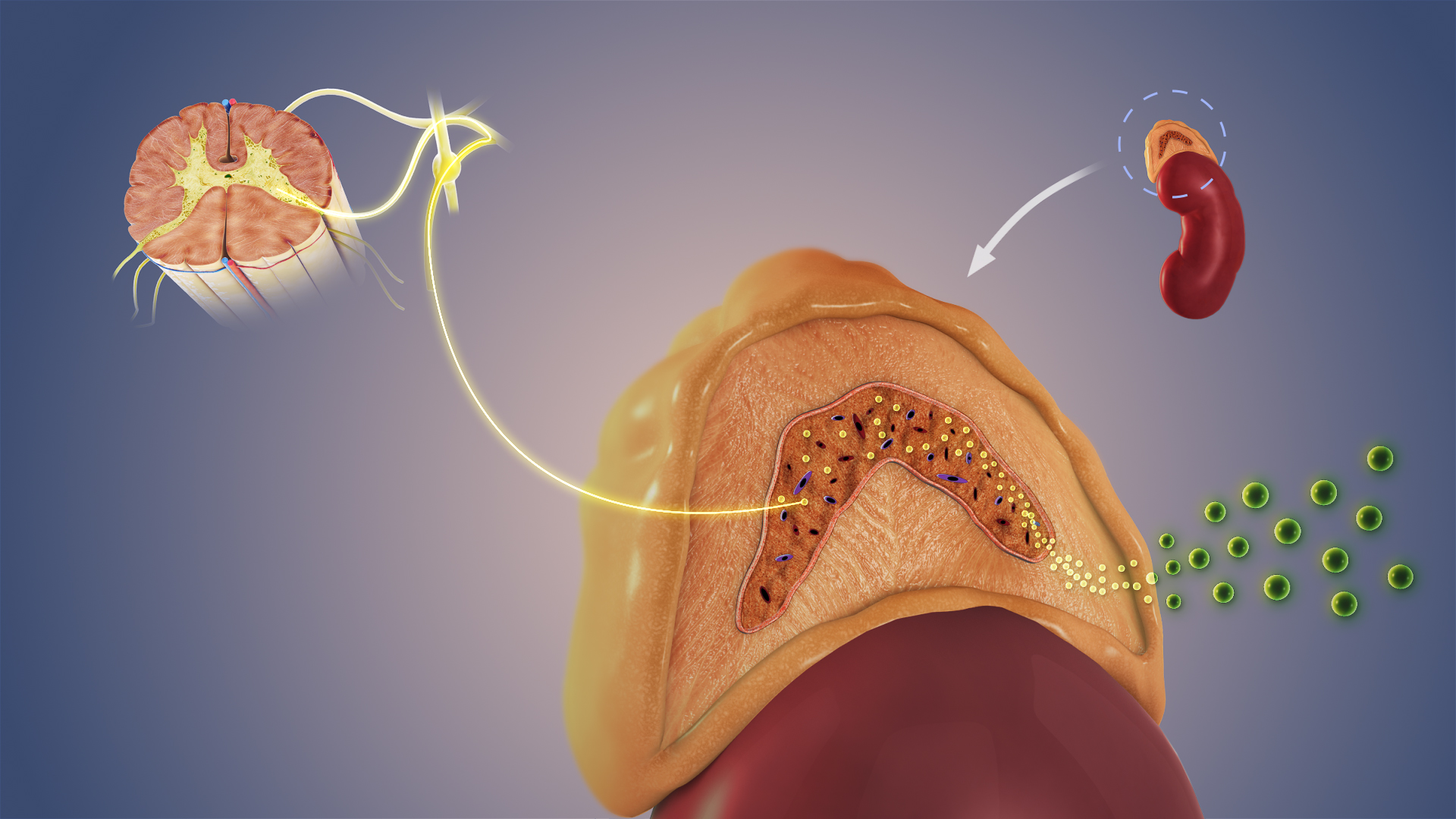
A flow diagram showing the process of stimulation of adrenal medulla that makes it release adrenaline, that further acts on adrenoreceptors, indirectly mediating or mimicking sympathetic activity

At the effector organs, sympathetic ganglionic neurons release noradrenaline (norepinephrine), along with other cotransmitters such as ATP, to act on adrenergic receptors, with the exception of the sweat glands and the adrenal medulla:

- Acetylcholine is the preganglionic neurotransmitter for both divisions of the ANS, as well as the postganglionic neurotransmitter of parasympathetic neurons. Nerves that release acetylcholine are said to be cholinergic. In the parasympathetic system, ganglionic neurons use acetylcholine as a neurotransmitter to stimulate muscarinic receptors.
- At the adrenal medulla, there is no postsynaptic neuron. Instead, the presynaptic neuron releases acetylcholine to act on nicotinic receptors. Stimulation of the adrenal medulla releases adrenaline (epinephrine) into the bloodstream, which acts on adrenoceptors, thereby indirectly mediating or mimicking sympathetic activity.

A full table is at Table of neurotransmitter actions in the ANS.

=== Autonomic nervous system and the immune system ===
Recent studies indicate that ANS activation is critical for regulating the local and systemic immune-inflammatory responses and may influence acute stroke outcomes. Therapeutic approaches modulating the activation of the ANS or the immune-inflammatory response could promote neurologic recovery after stroke.

== History ==
In 1665, Thomas Willis used the terminology, and in 1900, John Newport Langley used the term, defining the two divisions as the sympathetic and parasympathetic nervous systems.

== Caffeine effects ==
Caffeine is a bioactive ingredient found in commonly consumed beverages such as coffee, tea, and sodas. Short-term physiological effects of caffeine include increased blood pressure and sympathetic nerve outflow. Habitual consumption of caffeine may inhibit physiological short-term effects. Consumption of caffeinated espresso increases parasympathetic activity in habitual caffeine consumers; however, decaffeinated espresso inhibits parasympathetic activity in habitual caffeine consumers. It is possible that other bioactive ingredients in decaffeinated espresso may also contribute to the inhibition of parasympathetic activity in habitual caffeine consumers.

Caffeine is capable of increasing work capacity while individuals perform strenuous tasks. In one study, caffeine provoked a greater maximum heart rate while a strenuous task was being performed compared to a placebo. This tendency is likely due to caffeine's ability to increase sympathetic nerve outflow. Furthermore, this study found that recovery after intense exercise was slower when caffeine was consumed prior to exercise. This finding is indicative of caffeine's tendency to inhibit parasympathetic activity in non-habitual consumers. The caffeine-stimulated increase in nerve activity is likely to evoke other physiological effects as the body attempts to maintain homeostasis.

The effects of caffeine on parasympathetic activity may vary depending on the position of the individual when autonomic responses are measured. One study found that the seated position inhibited autonomic activity after caffeine consumption (75 mg); however, parasympathetic activity increased in the supine position. This finding may explain why some habitual caffeine consumers (75 mg or less) do not experience short-term effects of caffeine if their routine requires many hours in a seated position. The data supporting increased parasympathetic activity in the supine position was derived from an experiment involving participants between the ages of 25 and 30 who were considered healthy and sedentary. Caffeine may influence autonomic activity differently for individuals who are more active or elderly.

== See also ==
- Dysautonomia
- Feeling
- International Society for Autonomic Neuroscience
- Polyvagal Theory
- Medullary ischemic reflex
