= Sympathetic trunk =

Bundle of nerve fibers

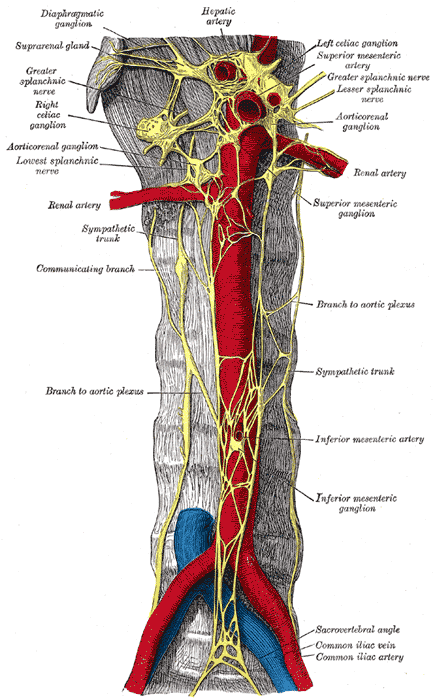
- Abdominal portion of the sympathetic trunk, with the celiac plexus and hypogastric plexus. (Sympathetic trunk labeled at center left.)

- Scheme showing pathways (white/grey rami are spatially reversed, possibly for clarity?) of a typical spinal nerve.: 1. Somatic efferent.; 2. Somatic afferent.; 3,4,5. Sympathetic efferent. 6,7. Autonomic afferent.

Details

Identifiers
- Latin: truncus sympathicus
- TA98: A14.3.01.002
- TA2: 6602
- FMA: 6258

The sympathetic trunk (sympathetic chain, gangliated cord) is a paired bundle of nerve fibers that run from the base of the skull to the coccyx. It is a major component of the sympathetic nervous system.

== Structure ==
The sympathetic trunk lies just lateral to the vertebral bodies for the entire length of the vertebral column. It interacts with the anterior rami of spinal nerves by way of rami communicantes. The sympathetic trunk permits preganglionic fibers of the sympathetic nervous system to ascend to spinal levels superior to T1 and descend to spinal levels inferior to L2/3.

The superior end of it is continued upward through the carotid canal into the skull, and forms a plexus on the internal carotid artery; the inferior part travels in front of the coccyx, where it converges with the other trunk at a structure known as the ganglion impar.

Along the length of the sympathetic trunk are sympathetic ganglia known as paravertebral ganglia.

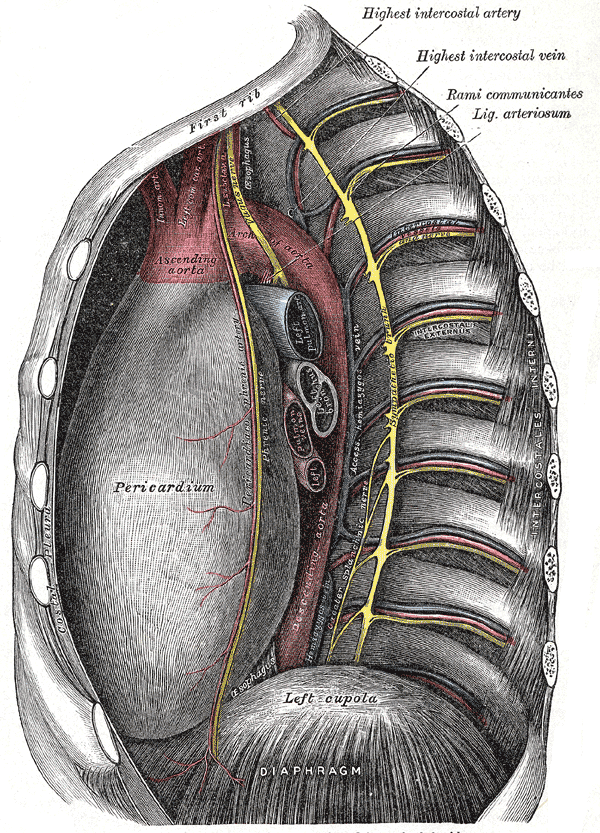
The sympathetic trunk (yellow) can be seen just lateral to the vertebral column.

=== Relations ===
In the cervical region, the sympathetic trunk is situated upon the prevertebral fascia posterior to the carotid sheath.

== Function ==
The sympathetic trunk is a fundamental part of the sympathetic nervous system, and part of the autonomic nervous system. It allows nerve fibres to travel to spinal nerves that are superior and inferior to the one in which they originated. Also, a number of nerves, such as most of the splanchnic nerves, arise directly from the trunks.

Autonomic nervous system's jurisdiction to organs in the human body
Organ	Nerves	Spinal column origin
stomach	PS: anterior and posterior vagal trunks; S: greater splanchnic nerves	T5, T6, T7, T8, T9, sometimes T10
duodenum	PS: vagus nerves; S: greater splanchnic nerves	T5, T6, T7, T8, T9, sometimes T10
jejunum and ileum	PS: posterior vagal trunks; S: greater splanchnic nerves	T5, T6, T7, T8, T9
spleen	S: greater splanchnic nerves	T6, T7, T8
gallbladder and liver	PS: vagus nerve; S: celiac plexus; right phrenic nerve	T6, T7, T8, T9
colon	PS: vagus nerves and pelvic splanchnic nerves; S: lesser and least splanchnic nerves	T10, T11, T12 (proximal colon); L1, L2, L3, (distal colon)
pancreatic head	PS: vagus nerves; S: thoracic splanchnic nerves	T8, T9
appendix	nerves to superior mesenteric plexus	T10
bladder	PS: pelvic splanchnic nerves to detrusor muscles; S: inferior hypogastric nerves	S2-S4
kidneys and ureters	PS: vagus nerve; S: thoracic and lumbar splanchnic nerves	T11, T12

== Additional images ==
The formation of the spinal nerve from the dorsal and ventral roots.

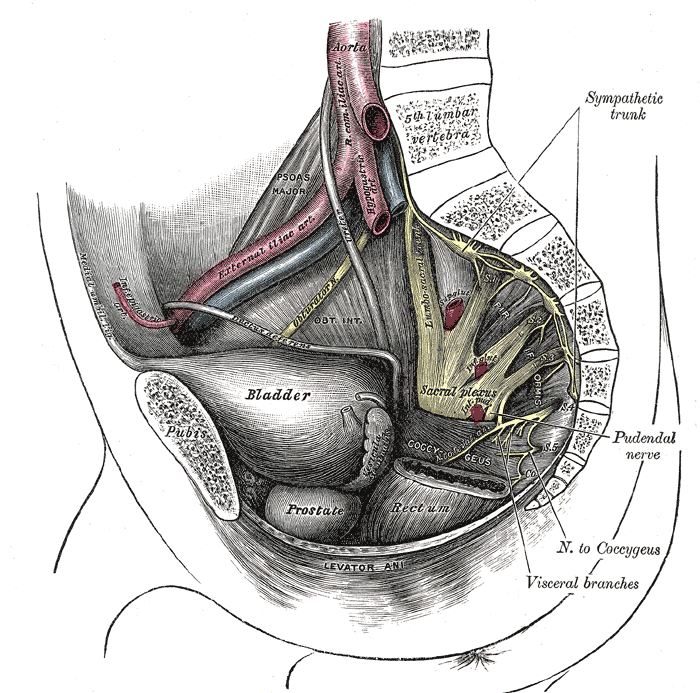
Dissection of side wall of pelvis showing sacral and pudendal plexuses.

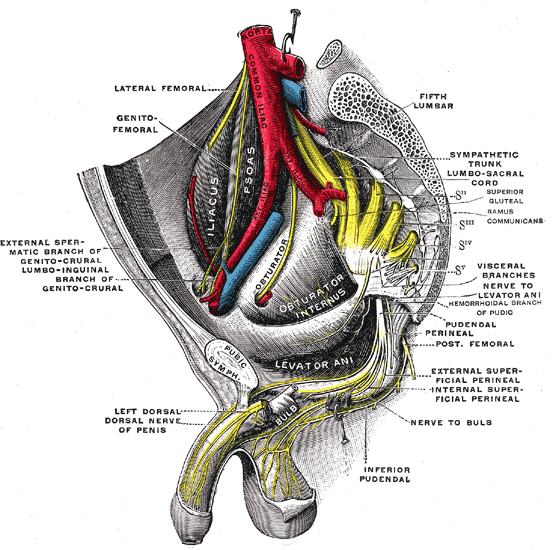
Sacral plexus of the right side.

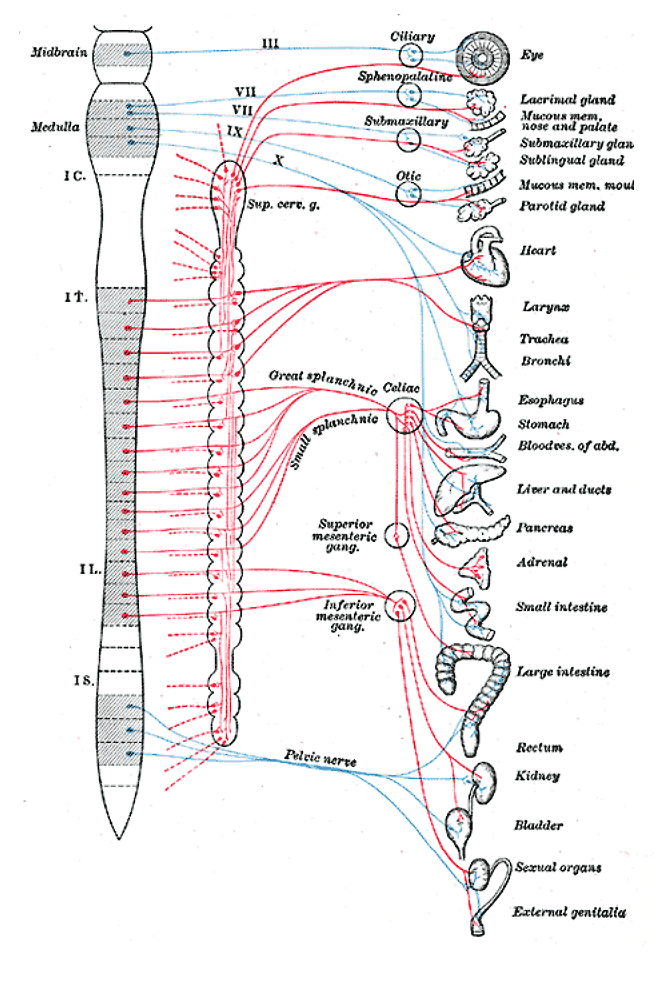
Diagram of efferent sympathetic nervous system.

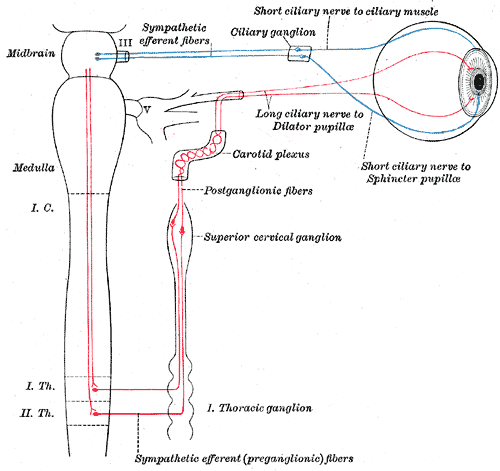
Sympathetic connections of the ciliary and superior cervical ganglia.

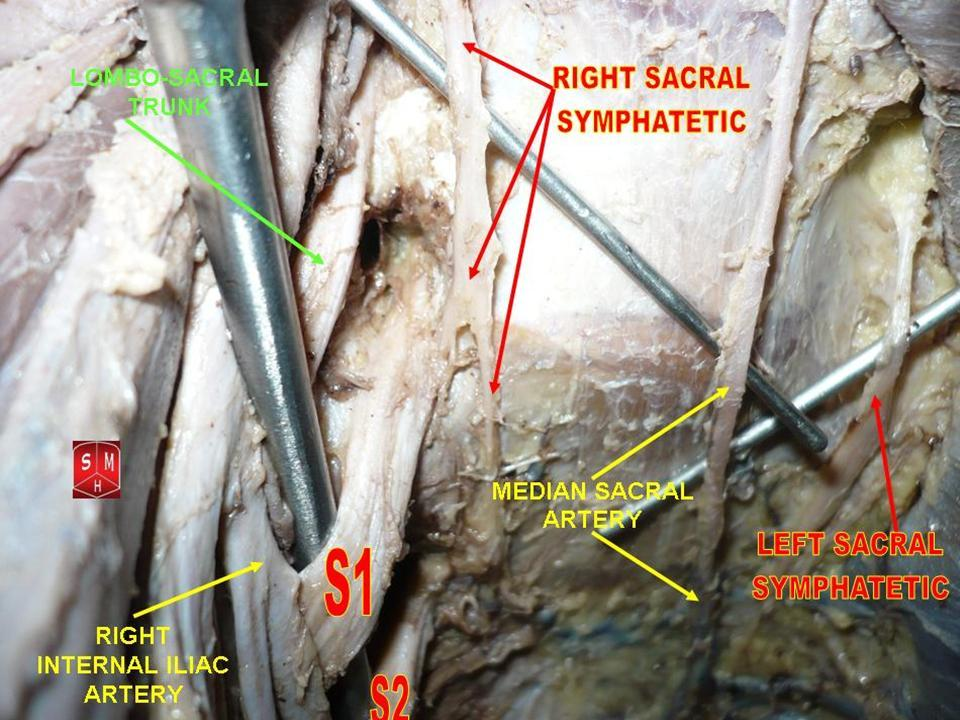
Sacral sympathetic

== See also ==
- Horner's syndrome
