= Splanchnic nerves =

Type of nerve in the human body

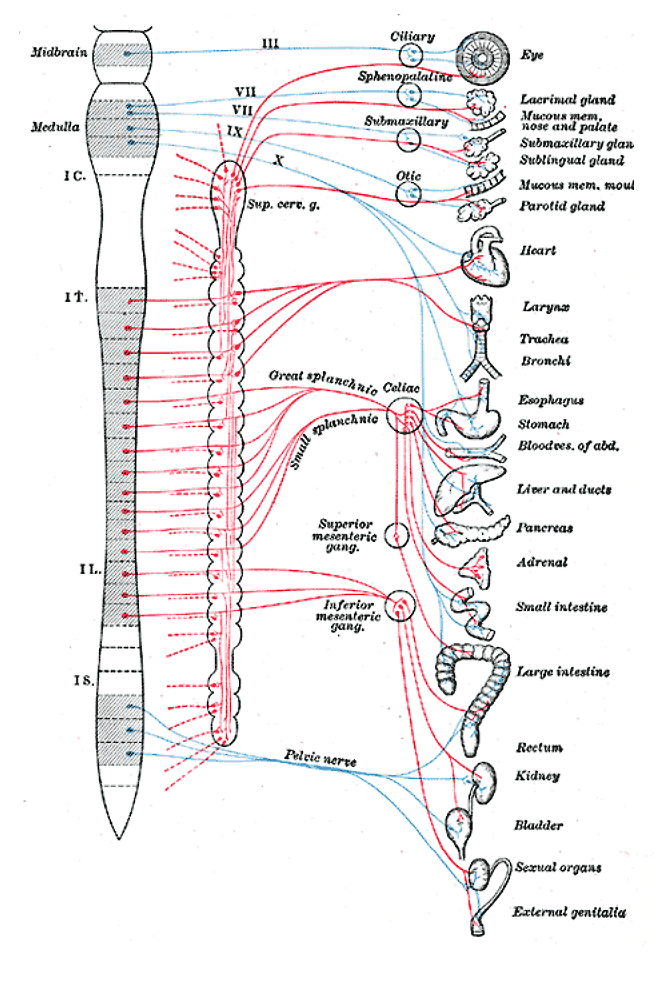
- Nerves of the autonomic nervous system, with splanchnic nerves seen in center.

Identifiers
- MeSH: D013153

The splanchnic nerves are paired visceral nerves (nerves that contribute to the innervation of the internal organs), carrying fibers of the autonomic nervous system (visceral efferent fibers) as well as sensory fibers from the organs (visceral afferent fibers). All carry sympathetic fibers except for the pelvic splanchnic nerves, which carry parasympathetic fibers.

== Types ==
The term splanchnic nerves can refer to:

- Cardiopulmonary nerves
- Thoracic splanchnic nerves (greater, lesser, and least)
- Lumbar splanchnic nerves
- Sacral splanchnic nerves
- Pelvic splanchnic nerves

Comparison
Nerve		Pre-/postsynaptic	autonomic system	Origin	Targets
Cardiopulmonary nerves		Postsynaptic	sympathetic	cervical and upper thoracic ganglia	Thoracic cavity
Thoracic splanchnic nerves	generally	Presynaptic	sympathetic	lower thoracic ganglia	Prevertebral ganglia
Thoracic splanchnic nerves	Greater splanchnic nerve	Presynaptic	sympathetic	T5–T9 or T10	Celiac ganglia
Thoracic splanchnic nerves	Lesser splanchnic nerve	Presynaptic	sympathetic	T10–T11	Superior mesenteric ganglia and Aorticorenal ganglia
Thoracic splanchnic nerves	Least splanchnic nerve	Presynaptic	sympathetic	T12	Renal plexus
Lumbar splanchnic nerves		Presynaptic	sympathetic	L1–2	Inferior mesenteric ganglia, ganglia of intermesenteric and hypogastric plexuses
Sacral splanchnic nerves		Presynaptic	sympathetic	sacral part of sympathetic trunk	inferior hypogastric plexus and ganglia to the pelvic viscera
Pelvic splanchnic nerves		Presynaptic	parasympathetic	S2–S4	intrinsic ganglia of descending and sigmoid colon, rectum, and inferior hypogastric plexus and ganglia to the pelvic viscera

== See also ==
- Terminal cisterna
- Rexed lamina
- Preganglionic nerve fiber
- Postganglionic nerve fiber
