= Rafael Botello =

Spanish Paralympic athlete

Personal information
- Full name: Rafael Botello Jiménez
- Nickname: Rafa
- Nationality: Spanish
- Born: 23 February 1979 (age 47) Vic, Barcelona, Spain
- Website: RafaBotello.com

Sport
- Country: Spain
- Sport: Athletics
- Event: Marathon
- Coached by: Javier Gutierrez
Medal record
Men's para-duathlon
Representing Spain
World Championships
Gold medal – first place	2014 Pontevedra	PT1
Silver medal – second place	2011 Gijon	TRI 1

Rafael Botello Jiménez (born 23 February 1979) is a Spanish wheelchair athlete specializing in long-distance events. He has represented Spain at the 2008 and the 2012 Summer Paralympics.

== Personal life ==
Botello was born in Vic, Barcelona on 23 February 1979 and since then still living in Manlleu (SPAIN).

His father was born in Melilla, a Spanish enclave in northern Africa, and his mother was born in Arquillos, Jaen. He has one sister.

In 2002, he was in a bicycle accident that left him a paraplegic because of damage to the thoracic spinal nerve 11 and 12. Prior to his accident he played a number of sports on the amateur level including football, kickboxing and athletics.

== Athletics ==
Botello is a T54 competitor. In 2017, he was the Spanish national record holder in the 1500 meters, on the track, and 2011 in 5 km, 10 km and 2017 in marathon on the road. He was the first Spanish wheelchair competitor to go sub-1:25 in the marathon and sub-10:15 in the 5,000 meters.

In an average year of training and competition, he will cover a distance 8,500 kilometres (5,300 mi). At the same time, he will spend six days a week training. Inside Spain, there is little funding for wheelchair marathon races and few money races and no professional category. Thus, he spends a lot of the time competing outside the country.

In order to get sponsorship, he had to personally approach and sell himself to potential sponsors.

At the 2006 World Championships in Sweden, Botello won a gold medal in the 3,000 meter event. He competed at the 2008 Summer Paralympics in the marathon where he finished seventh. In 2010, he competed in the New York City Marathon, finishing in a time of 1:47.39, making him the first Spanish wheelchair competitor to finish the race. The 2010 race was his fifth time competing in the race in which he placed in the top ten three times. In 2011, he did the running part of the CAN Triathlon Mallorca, with Vicente Javier Torres Ramis doing the swimming leg and Joan Llaneras doing the cycling component.

Botello competed at the 2012 Summer Paralympics. He failed to make the finals in the 5,000 meters event. He finished ninth in the marathon with a time of 1:33.05. Melilla hosted a half marathon in November 2012 that he participated in. It was the first half marathon he competed in, and took place in his father's hometown. In March 2013, he competed at the Los Angeles Marathon. In March 2013, he participated in an international training camp for wheelchair athletes held in Costa Rica.
