= Table of neurotransmitter actions in the ANS =

This is a table of neurotransmitter actions in the ANS (autonomic nervous system). It includes the circulatory system, the respiratory system, the visual system, the digestive system, the endocrine system, the urinary system, the reproductive system, and the integumentary system. Both effects of the sympathetic nervous system (adrenergic) and parasympathetic nervous system (muscarinic) are included.

== Circulatory system ==
=== Heart ===
Target	Sympathetic (adrenergic)	Parasympathetic (muscarinic)
cardiac output	β1, (β2): increases	M2: decreases
SA node: heart rate (chronotropic)	β1, (β2): increases	M2: decreases
Atrial cardiac muscle: contractility (inotropic)	β1, (β2): increases	M2: decreases
at AV node	β1: increases conduction increases cardiac muscle automaticity	M2: decreases conduction Atrioventricular block
Ventricular cardiac muscle	β1, (β2): increases contractility (inotropic) increases cardiac muscle automaticity	---

=== Blood vessels ===
Target	Sympathetic (adrenergic)	Parasympathetic (muscarinic)
vascular smooth muscle in general	α1: contracts; β2: relaxes	M3: relaxes
renal artery	α1: constricts	---
larger coronary arteries	α1 and α2: constricts	---
smaller coronary arteries	β2: dilates	---
arteries to viscera	α: constricts	---
arteries to skin	α: constricts	---
arteries to brain	α1: constricts	---
arteries to erectile tissue	α1: constricts	M3: dilates
arteries to salivary glands	α: constricts	M3: dilates
hepatic artery	α: constricts	---
arteries to skeletal muscle	β2: dilates	---
Veins	α1 and α2: constricts β2: dilates	---

=== Other ===
Target	Sympathetic (adrenergic)	Parasympathetic (muscarinic)
platelets	α2: aggregates	---
mast cells - histamine	β2: inhibits	---

== Respiratory system ==
Target	Sympathetic (adrenergic)	Parasympathetic (muscarinic)
smooth muscles of bronchioles*	β2: relaxes (major contribution) α1: contracts (minor contribution)	M3: contracts

^{✱} The bronchioles have no sympathetic innervation, but are instead affected by circulating adrenaline

== Visual system ==
Target	Sympathetic (adrenergic)	Parasympathetic (muscarinic)
Pupil dilator muscle	α1: Dilates (causes mydriasis)	
Iris sphincter muscle	-	M3: contracts (causes miosis)
Ciliary muscle	β2: relaxes (causes long-range focus)	M3: contracts (causes short-range focus)

== Digestive system ==
Target	Sympathetic (adrenergic)	Parasympathetic (muscarinic)
salivary glands: secretions	β: stimulates viscous, amylase secretions α1: stimulates potassium secretions	M3: stimulates watery secretions
lacrimal glands (tears)	β: stimulates protein secretion	secretion of tears by stimulating muscarinic receptors (M3)
juxtaglomerular apparatus of kidney	β1: renin secretion	---
parietal cells	---	M1: Gastric acid secretion
liver	α1, β2: glycogenolysis, gluconeogenesis	---
adipose cells	β1, β3: stimulates lipolysis	---
GI tract (smooth muscle) motility	α1, α2, β2: decreases	M3, (M1): increases
sphincters of GI tract	α1, α2, β2: contracts	M3: relaxes
glands of GI tract	no effect	M3: secretes

== Endocrine system ==
Target	Sympathetic (adrenergic)	Parasympathetic (muscarinic)
pancreas (islets)	α2: decreases insulin secretion from beta cells, increases glucagon secretion from alpha cells	M3: increases secretion of both insulin and glucagon.
adrenal medulla	N (nicotinic ACh receptor): secretes epinephrine and norepinephrine	---

== Urinary system ==
Target	Sympathetic (adrenergic)	Parasympathetic (muscarinic)
Detrusor urinae muscle of bladder wall	β2, β3: relaxes	M3: contracts
internal urethral sphincter	α1: contracts	M3: relaxes

== Reproductive system ==
Target	Sympathetic (adrenergic)	Parasympathetic (muscarinic)
uterus	α1: contracts (pregnant) β2: relaxes (non-pregnant)	---
genitalia	α1: contracts (ejaculation)	M3: erection

== Integumentary system ==
Target	Sympathetic (muscarinic and adrenergic)	Parasympathetic
sweat gland secretions	α1: stimulates (minor contribution)	M: stimulates (major contribution)
arrector pili	α1: stimulates	---
