= Medullary ischemic reflex =

Response to drop in blood pressure in the brain

The medullary ischemic reflex is a big response to a drop in blood pressure in the brain particularly in the medulla, where the lack of oxygen due to decreased perfusion triggers an autonomic response from the cardiac and vasomotor centers. The cardiac and vasomotor centers respond to the decrease in blood pressure with sympathetic outflow to the heart and blood vessels. This outflow causes increased heart rate and force of contraction, as well as bodywide vasoconstriction. Together these responses increase blood pressure and perfusion rate to the brain, ending the feedback loop.
