= Cardiopulmonary nerves =

Group of nerves in the thorax

Cardiopulmonary nerves are splanchnic nerves that are postsynaptic and sympathetic. They originate in cervical and upper thoracic ganglia and innervate the thoracic cavity.

All major sympathetic cardiopulmonary nerves arise from the stellate ganglia and the caudal halves of the cervical sympathetic trunks below the level of the cricoid cartilage. Parasympathetic cardiopulmonary nerves arise from the recurrent laryngeal nerves and the thoracic vagus immediately distal to them. These interconnect with the sympathetic cardiopulmonary nerves to form the ventral and dorsal cardiopulmonary plexuses.
