= Axial line (dermatomes) =

Concept in anatomy

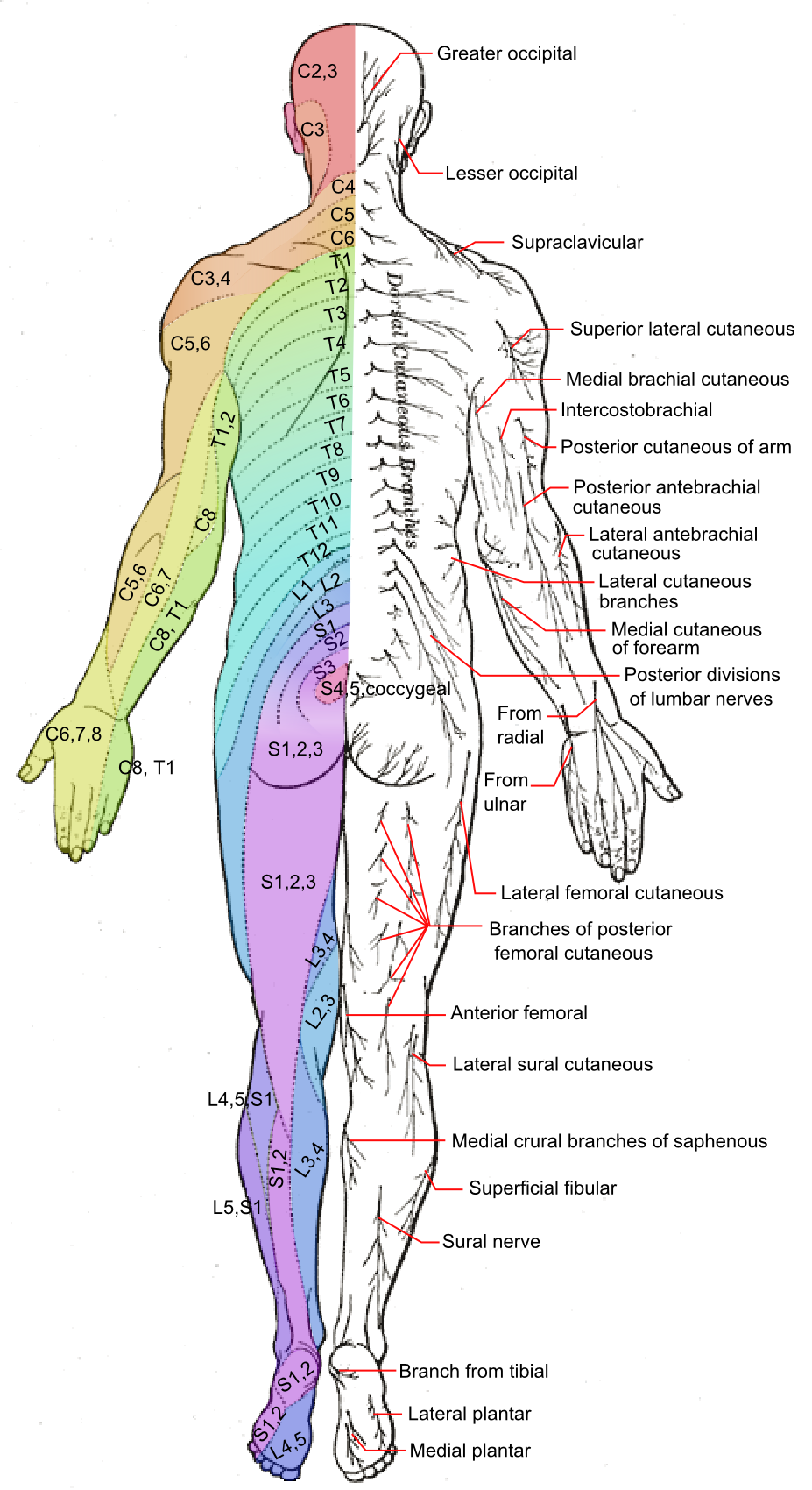
Posterior Dermatomes

The axial line is the line between two adjacent dermatomes that are not represented by immediately adjacent spinal levels. Although dermatomes are shown to be discrete segments on dermatomal maps (like in the image opposite), they are in fact not; adjacent dermatomes overlap with one another. This is one of the reasons for the variety of different dermatomal maps proposed. However, at axial lines, adjacent dermatomes do not overlap. An example of an axial line would be the line between the S2 and L4 dermatomes on the calf.
