= Mesenteric ganglion =

Mesenteric ganglion may refer to:

- inferior mesenteric ganglion
- superior mesenteric ganglion
