= Thoracic spinal nerve 3 =

Human spinal anatomy

Thoracic spinal nerve
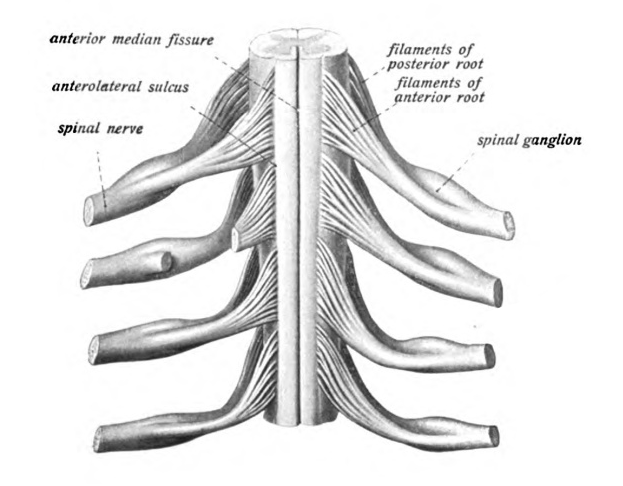
- The spinal cord with spinal nerves.

Details

Identifiers
- Latin: nervi spinalis
- FMA: 6171

The thoracic spinal nerve 3 (T3) is a spinal nerve of the thoracic segment.

It originates from the spinal column from below the thoracic vertebra 3 (T3).
