= Thoracic vertebrae =

Vertebrae between the cervical vertebrae and the lumbar vertebrae

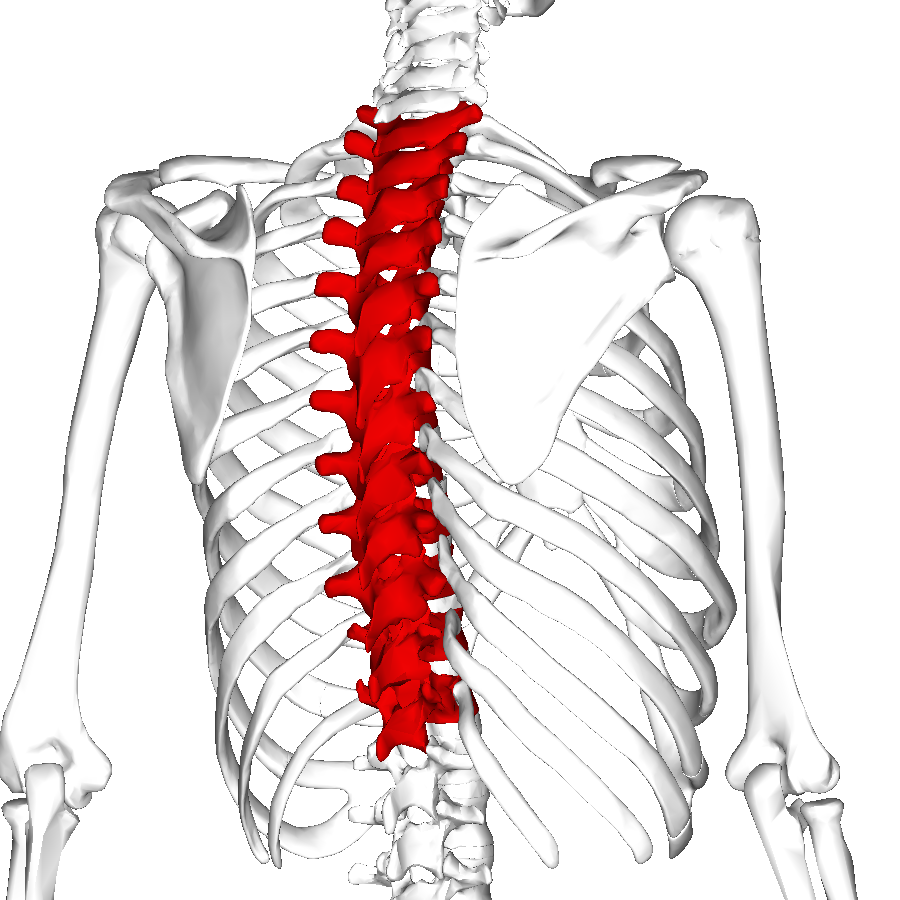
- Position of the thoracic vertebrae (T1–T12)

- Animation of T2

Details

Identifiers
- Latin: vertebrae thoracicae
- MeSH: D013904
- TA98: A02.2.03.001
- TA2: 1059
- FMA: 9139

In vertebrates, thoracic vertebrae compose the middle segment of the vertebral column, between the cervical vertebrae and the lumbar vertebrae. (Note: The thoracic vertebrae were historically called dorsal vertebrae; cf. . Especially due to the free copying of old public domain versions of Gray's Anatomy, the old term may still be encountered, however the old term is long obsolete and misleading, as the dorsum refers to the whole back and not just the thoracic part of the back.) In humans, there are twelve thoracic vertebrae of intermediate size between the cervical and lumbar vertebrae; they increase in size going towards the lumbar vertebrae. They are distinguished by the presence of facets on the sides of the bodies for articulation with the heads of the ribs, as well as facets on the transverse processes of all, except the eleventh and twelfth, for articulation with the tubercles of the ribs. By convention, the human thoracic vertebrae are numbered T1–T12, with the first one (T1) located closest to the skull and the others going down the spine toward the lumbar region.

== General characteristics ==
These are the general characteristics of the second through eighth thoracic vertebrae. The first and ninth through twelfth vertebrae contain certain peculiarities, and are detailed below.

The vertebral bodies in the middle of the thoracic region are heart-shaped and as broad in the anteroposterior as in the transverse direction. At the ends of the thoracic region they resemble respectively those of the cervical and lumbar vertebrae. They are slightly thicker behind than in front, flat above and below, convex from side to side in front, deeply concave behind, and slightly constricted laterally and in front. They present, on either side, two costal demi-facets, one above, near the root of the pedicle, the other below, in front of the inferior vertebral notch; these are covered with cartilage in the fresh state, and, when the vertebrae are articulated with one another, form, with the intervening intervertebral fibrocartilages, oval surfaces for the reception of the heads of the ribs.

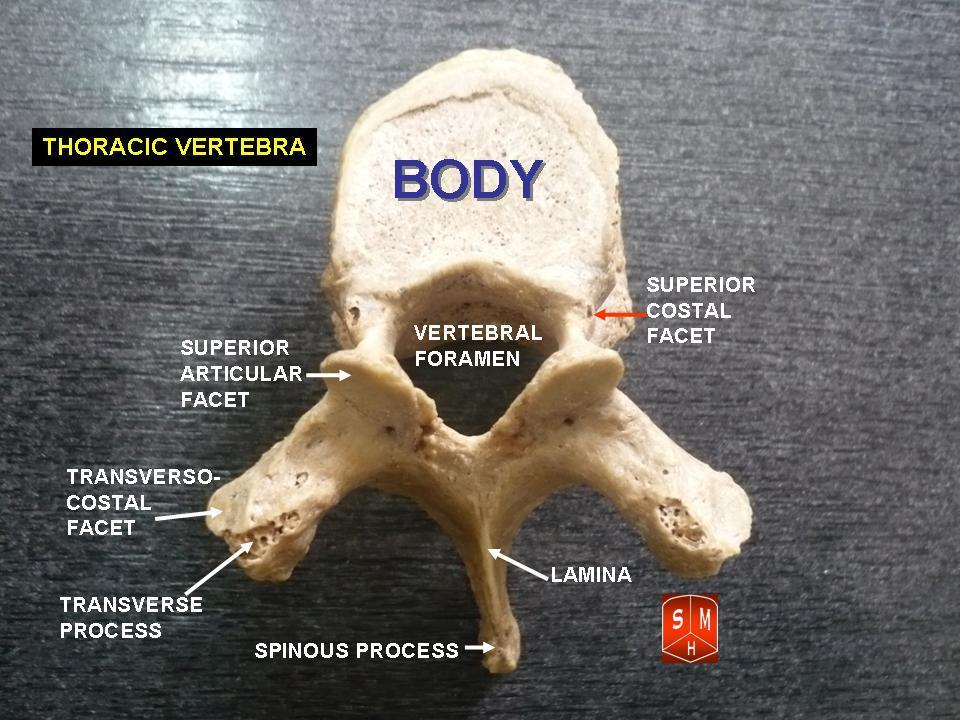
Thoracic vertebra

The pedicles are directed backward and slightly upward, and the inferior vertebral notches are of large size, and deeper than in any other region of the vertebral column.

The laminae are broad, thick, and imbricated – that is to say, they overlap those of subjacent vertebrae like tiles on a roof and connect with the pedicles to surround and protect the spinal cord.

The intervertebral foramen is small, and circular, with two at each intervertebral level, one for the right and one for the left exiting nerve roots.

The vertebral foramen is the large opening posterior to the vertebral body also known as the spinal canal. It contains and protects the spinal cord at the thoracic level.

The spinous process is long, triangular on coronal section, directed obliquely downward, arising from the lamina and ending in a tuberculated extremity. These processes overlap from the fifth to the eighth, but are less oblique in direction above and below.

The superior articular processes are thin plates of bone projecting upward from the junctions of the pedicles and laminae; their articular facets are practically flat, and are directed backward and a little lateralward and upward.

The inferior articular processes are fused to a considerable extent with the laminae, and project slightly beyond their lower borders; their facets are directed proximally, medially, and inferiorly to the lamina.

The transverse processes arise from the arch behind the superior articular processes and pedicles; they are thick, strong, and of considerable length, directed obliquely backward and lateralward, and each ends in a clubbed extremity, on the front of which is a small, concave surface, for articulation with the tubercle of a rib.

== Individual thoracic vertebrae ==
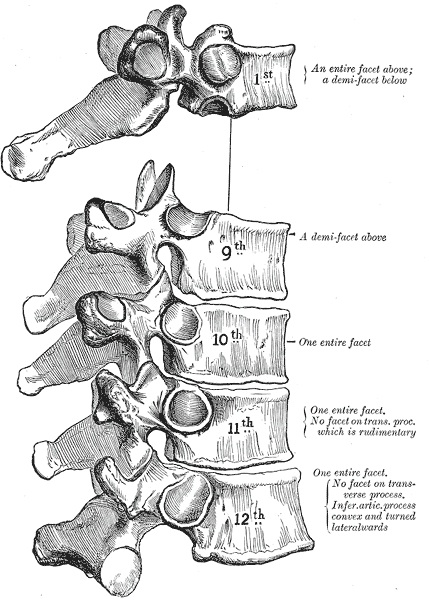
The first and ninth through twelfth thoracic vertebra have some peculiarities

=== First thoracic vertebra (T1) ===
The first thoracic vertebra has, on either side of the body, an entire articular facet for the head of the first rib, and a demi-facet for the upper half of the head of the second rib.

The body is like that of a cervical vertebra, being broad, concave, and lipped on either side.

The superior articular surfaces are directed upward and backward; the spinous process is thick, long, and almost horizontal.

The transverse processes are long, and the upper vertebral notches are deeper than those of the other thoracic vertebrae.

The thoracic spinal nerve 1 (T1) passes inferior to it.

=== Second thoracic vertebra (T2) ===
The thoracic spinal nerve 2 (T2) passes inferior to it. The second thoracic vertebra is larger than the first thoracic vertebra.

=== Third thoracic vertebra (T3) ===
The thoracic spinal nerve 3 (T3) passes inferior to it.

=== Fourth thoracic vertebra (T4) ===
The fourth thoracic vertebra, together with the fifth, is at the same level as the sternal angle.

The thoracic spinal nerve 4 (T4) passes inferior it.

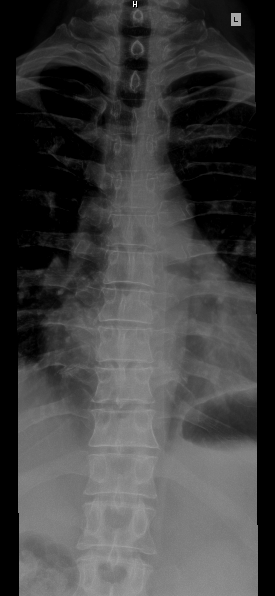
A thoracic spine X-ray of a 57-year-old male.

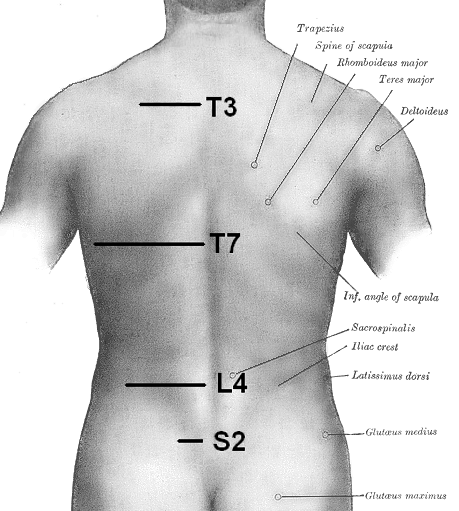
Surface orientation of T3 and T7, at middle of spine of scapula and at inferior angle of the scapula, respectively.

=== Fifth thoracic vertebra (T5) ===
The fifth thoracic vertebra, together with the fourth, is at the same level as the sternal angle. The human trachea divides into two main bronchi at the level of the 5th thoracic vertebra, but may also end higher or lower, depending on breathing.

The thoracic spinal nerve 5 (T5) passes inferior to it.

=== Sixth thoracic vertebra (T6) ===
The thoracic spinal nerve 6 (T6) passes inferior to it.

=== Seventh thoracic vertebra (T7) ===
The thoracic spinal nerve 7 (T7) passes inferior to it.

=== Eighth thoracic vertebra (T8) ===
The eighth thoracic vertebra is, together with the ninth thoracic vertebra, at the same level as the xiphisternum.

The thoracic spinal nerve 8 (T8) passes inferior to it.

=== Ninth thoracic vertebra (T9) ===
The ninth thoracic vertebra may have no demi-facets below. In some subjects however, it has two demi-facets on either side; when this occurs the tenth doesn't have facets but demi-facets at the upper part.

The thoracic spinal nerve 9 (T9) passes inferior to it.

The xiphisternum (or xiphoid process of the sternum) is at the same level in the axial plane.

=== Tenth thoracic vertebra (T10) ===
The tenth thoracic vertebra has an entire articular facet (not demi-facet) on either side, which is placed partly on the lateral surface of the pedicle. It doesn't have any kind of facet below, because the following ribs only have one facet on their heads.

The thoracic spinal nerve 10 (T10) passes inferior to it.

=== Eleventh thoracic vertebra (T11) ===
In the eleventh thoracic vertebra the body approaches in its form and size to that of the lumbar vertebrae.

The articular facets for the heads of the ribs are of medium size, and placed chiefly on the pedicles, which are thicker and stronger in this and the next vertebra than in any other part of the thoracic region.

The spinous process is short, and nearly horizontal in direction.

The transverse processes are very short, tuberculated at their extremities, and do not have articular facets.

The thoracic spinal nerve 11 (T11) passes inferior to it.

=== Twelfth thoracic vertebra (T12) ===
The twelfth thoracic vertebra has the same general characteristics as the eleventh, but may be distinguished from it by its inferior articular surfaces being convex and directed lateralward, like those of the lumbar vertebrae; by the general form of the body, laminae, and spinous process, in which it resembles the lumbar vertebrae; and by each transverse process being subdivided into three elevations, the superior, inferior, and lateral tubercles: the superior and inferior correspond to the mammillary and accessory processes of the lumbar vertebrae. Traces of similar elevations are found on the transverse processes of the tenth and eleventh thoracic vertebrae.

The thoracic spinal nerve 12 (T12) passes inferior to it.

== Other animals ==
In other animals the number of thoracic vertebrae can vary greatly; for example, most marsupials have 13, but koalas have only 11. 12 to 15 is common among mammals, with 18 to 20 in horses, tapirs, rhinoceroses, and elephants, and extremes in mammals are marked by certain sloths with 25 and cetaceans with 9.

== Additional images ==
Position of thoracic vertebrae. Animation.

Same as the left, but bones around the thoracic vertebrae are shown as semi-transparent.

3D image

Animation showing the shape of thoracic vertebrae.

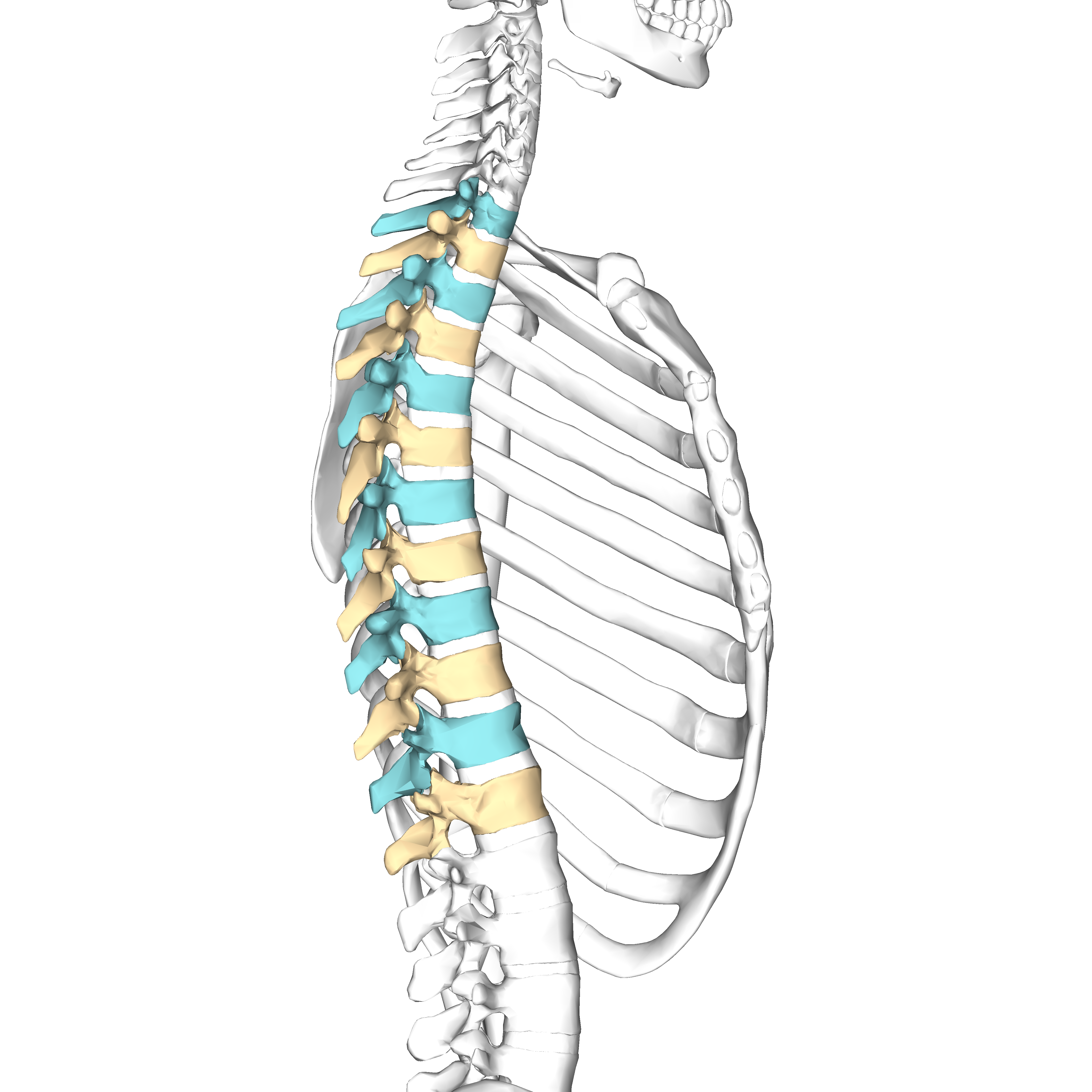
Lateral surface of the thoracic vertebrae. Right half of the thoracic skeleton is not shown.

Vertebral column.

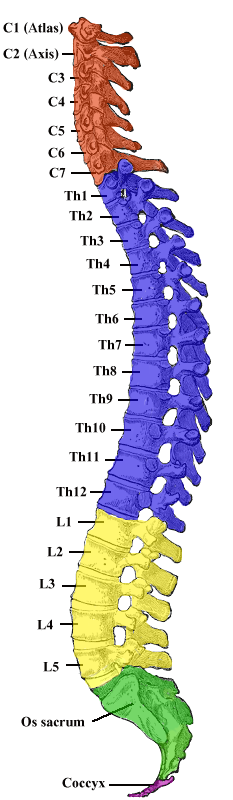
Vertebral column.

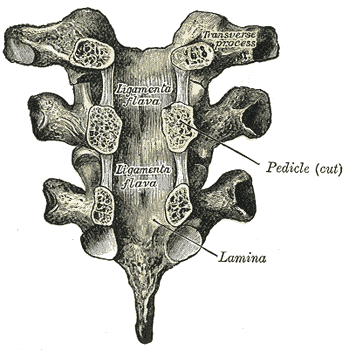
Vertebral arches of three thoracic vertebrae viewed from the front.

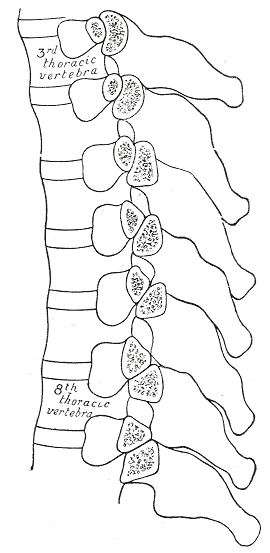
Section of the costotransverse joints from the third to the ninth inclusive.

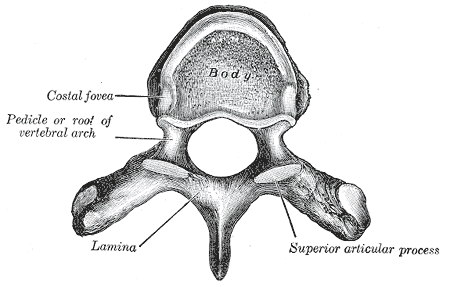
A typical thoracic vertebra, viewed from above.

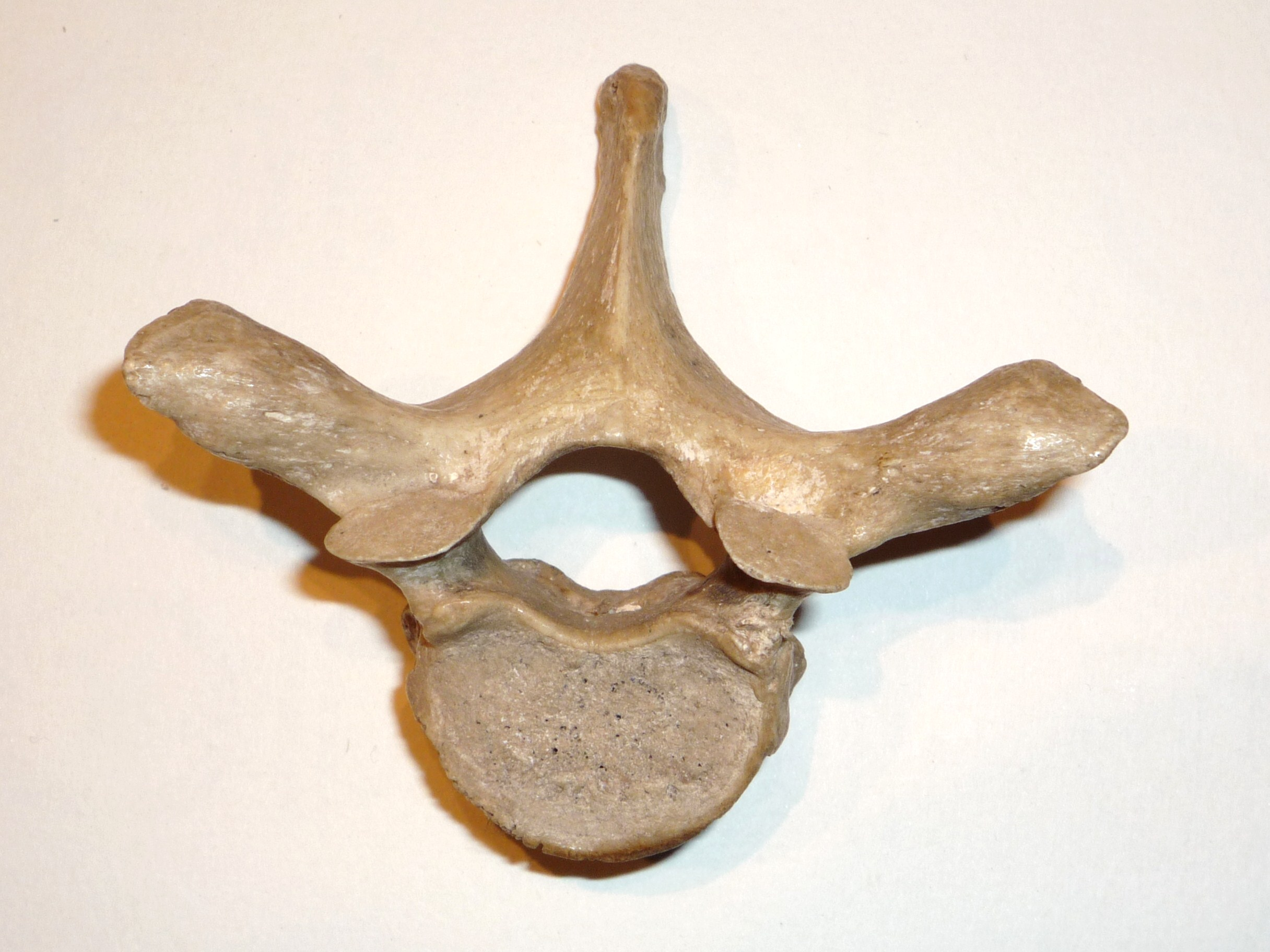
A thoracic vertebra, viewed from above.

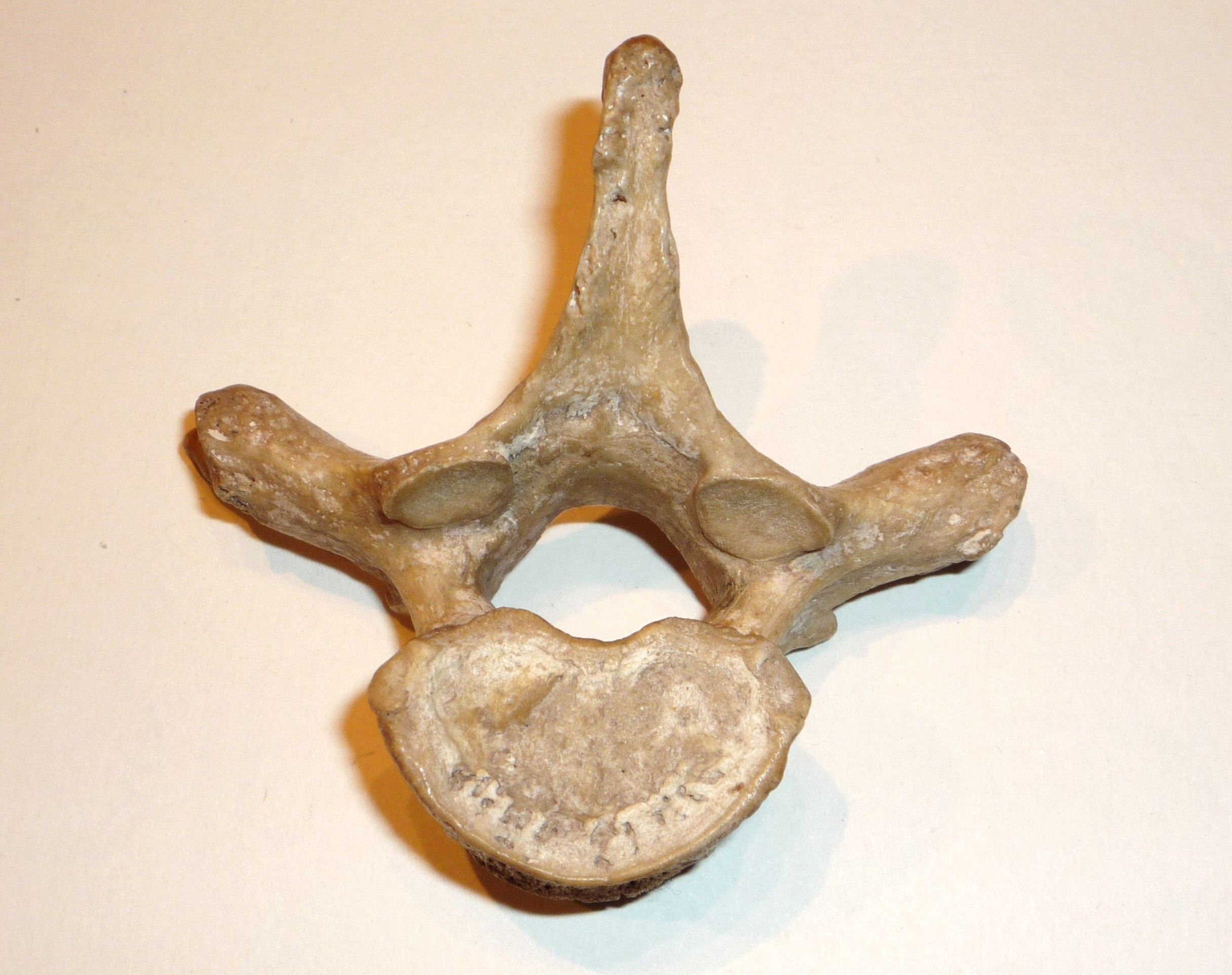
A thoracic vertebra, viewed from below.

== See also ==
- Costovertebral articulations
- Vertebral column
- Cervical vertebrae
- Lumbar vertebrae
