= Lumbar splanchnic nerves =

Group of nerves in the lower abdomen

Details

Identifiers
- Latin: nervi splanchnici lumbales
- TA98: A14.3.01.034
- TA2: 6635
- FMA: 6287

The lumbar splanchnic nerves are splanchnic nerves that arise from the lumbar ganglia (the lumbar part of the sympathetic trunk) and travel to an adjacent plexus near the aorta. They originate from L1 and L2. Together with fibres from the aortic plexus, they form the superior hypogastric plexus.

These nerves contain preganglionic sympathetic and general visceral afferent fibers.

The site of synapse is found in the inferior mesenteric ganglion and the postsynaptic fibers innervate the smooth muscle and glands of the pelvic viscera and hindgut.
