= Pelvic splanchnic nerves =

Splanchnic nerves arising from sacral spinal nerves

Details
- From: S2-S4

Identifiers
- Latin: nervi splanchnici pelvici nervi erigentes

Pelvic splanchnic nerves or nervi erigentes are splanchnic nerves that arise from sacral spinal nerves S2, S3, S4 to provide parasympathetic innervation to the organs of the pelvic cavity.

== Structure ==
The pelvic splanchnic nerves arise from the anterior rami of the sacral spinal nerves S2, S3, and S4, and enter the sacral plexus. They travel to their side's corresponding inferior hypogastric plexus, located bilaterally on the walls of the rectum. They contain both preganglionic parasympathetic fibers as well as visceral afferent fibers. Visceral afferent fibers go to spinal cord following pathway of pelvic splanchnic nerve fibers.

The parasympathetic nervous system is referred to as the craniosacral outflow; the pelvic splanchnic nerves are the sacral component. They are in the same region as the sacral splanchnic nerves, which arise from the sympathetic trunk and provide sympathetic efferent fibers.

== Function ==
The pelvic splanchnic nerves contribute to the innervation of the pelvic and genital organs. The nerves regulate the emptying of the urinary bladder, control opening and closing of the internal urethral sphincter, influence motility in the rectum as well as sexual functions like erection.

In the distal 1/3 of the transverse colon, and through the sigmoid and rectum, and the cervix in females, the pelvic splanchnic nerves supply parasympathetic function, including transmitting the sensation of pain. The proximal 2/3 of the transverse colon, and the rest of the proximal gastrointestinal tract is supplied its parasympathetic fibers by the vagus nerve.

== Clinical significance ==
Damage to the sacral spinal nerve roots can cause neurogenic bladder dysfunction and fecal incontinence.

== Society and culture ==
The pelvic splanchnic nerves are featured as a key plot point in "Parasites Lost", a 2001 episode of the American animated TV comedy Futurama; when protagonist Philip J. Fry is infected with parasitic worms, the rest of the crew use micro-droids to enter his body with the intention of tickling the pelvic splanchnic ganglion to trigger a convulsive bowel movement that they believe will expel the worms.

== See also ==
- Sacral splanchnic nerves
- Coccygeal plexus
