= Thoracic spinal nerve 8 =

Thoracic spinal nerve
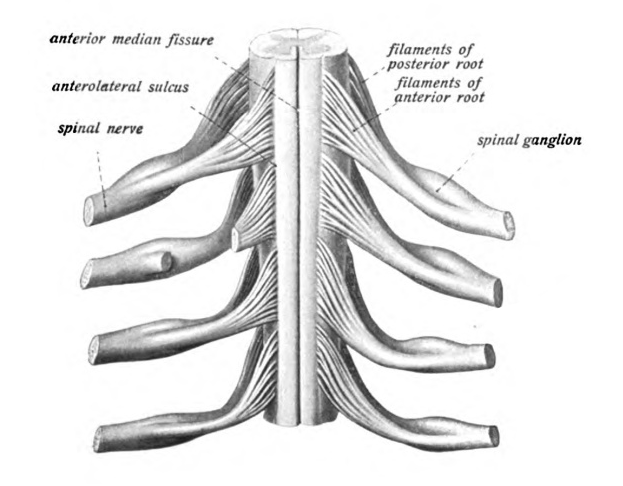
- The spinal cord with spinal nerves.

Details

Identifiers
- Latin: nervi spinalis
- FMA: 6302

The thoracic spinal nerve 8 (T8) is a spinal nerve of the thoracic segment.

It originates from the spinal column from below the thoracic vertebra 8 (T8).
