= Thoracic spinal nerve 6 =

Spinal nerve of the middle of the thorax

Thoracic spinal nerve
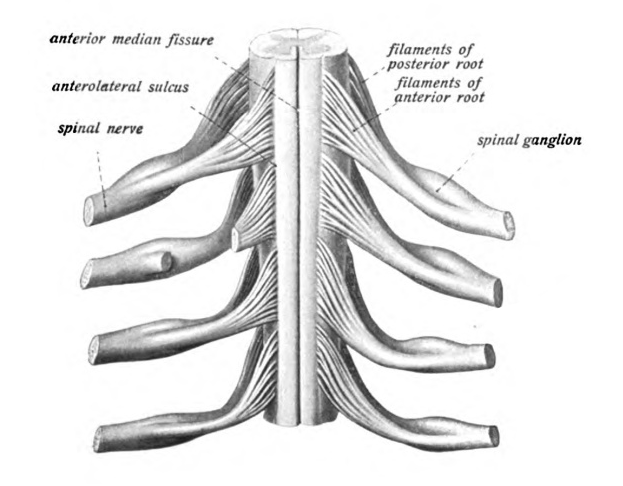
- The spinal cord with spinal nerves.

Details

Identifiers
- Latin: nervi spinalis
- FMA: 6296

The thoracic spinal nerve 6 (T6) is a spinal nerve of the thoracic segment.

It originates from the spinal column from below the thoracic vertebra 6 (T6).
