= Thoracic spinal nerve 7 =

Thoracic spinal nerve
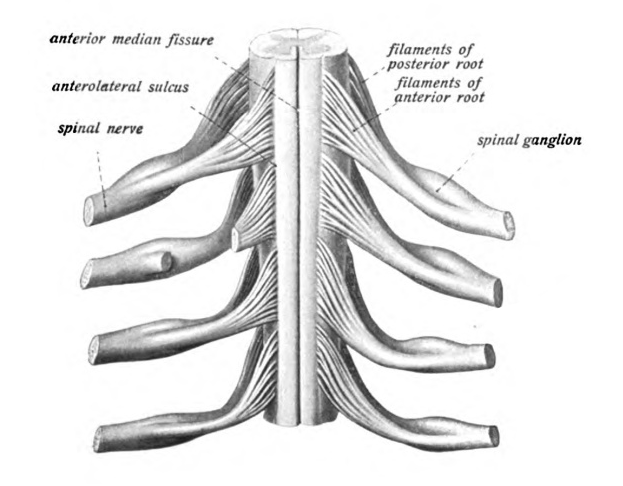
- The spinal cord with spinal nerves.

Details

Identifiers
- Latin: nervi spinalis
- FMA: 6299

The thoracic spinal nerve 7 (T7) is a spinal nerve of the thoracic segment.

It originates from the spinal column from below the thoracic vertebra 7 (T7).
