= Thoracic spinal nerve 9 =

Human spinal nerve

Thoracic spinal nerve
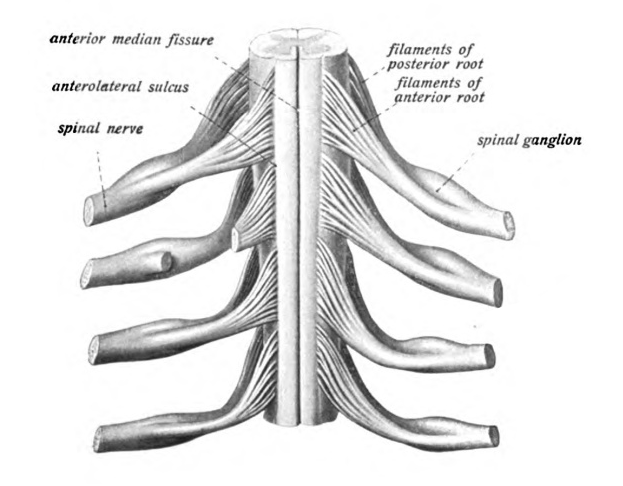
- The spinal cord with spinal nerves.

Details

Identifiers
- Latin: nervi spinalis
- FMA: 6306

The thoracic spinal nerve 9 (T9) is a spinal nerve of the thoracic segment.

It originates from the spinal column from below the thoracic vertebra 9 (T9).
