= Thoracic spinal nerve 5 =

Spinal nerve

Thoracic spinal nerve
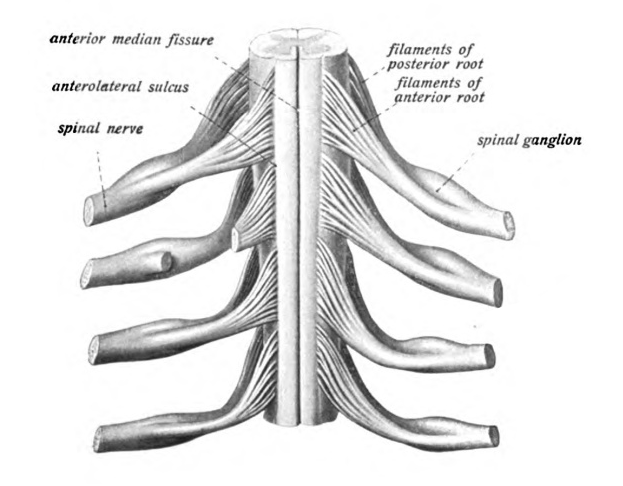
- The spinal cord with spinal nerves.

Details

Identifiers
- Latin: nervi spinalis
- FMA: 6293

The thoracic spinal nerve 5 (T5) is a spinal nerve of the thoracic segment.

It originates from the spinal column from below the thoracic vertebra 5 (T5).
