= Thoracic spinal nerve 10 =

Thoracic spinal nerve
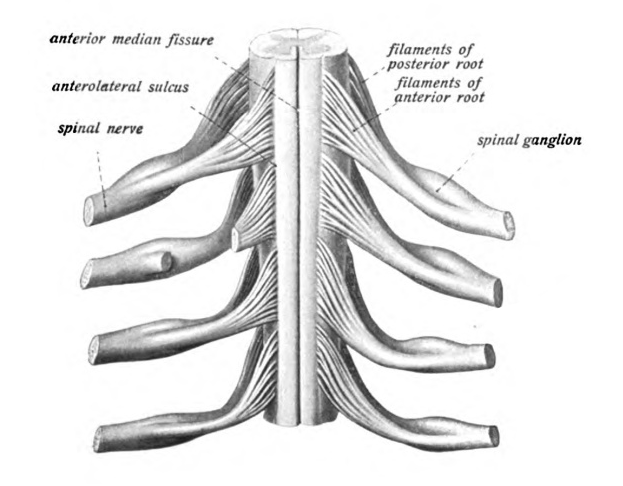
- The spinal cord with spinal nerves. T10+

Details

Identifiers
- Latin: nervi spinalis
- FMA: 6309

The thoracic spinal nerve 10 (T10) is a spinal nerve of the thoracic segment.

It originates from the spinal column from below the thoracic vertebra 10 (T10).
