= Thoracic spinal nerve 12 =

Thoracic spinal nerve
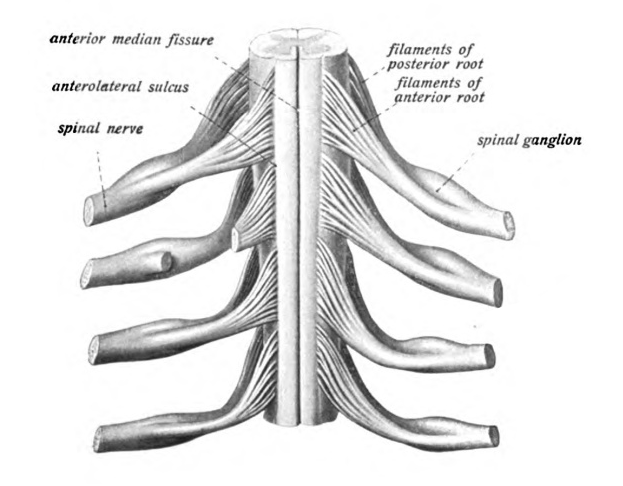
- The spinal cord with spinal nerves.

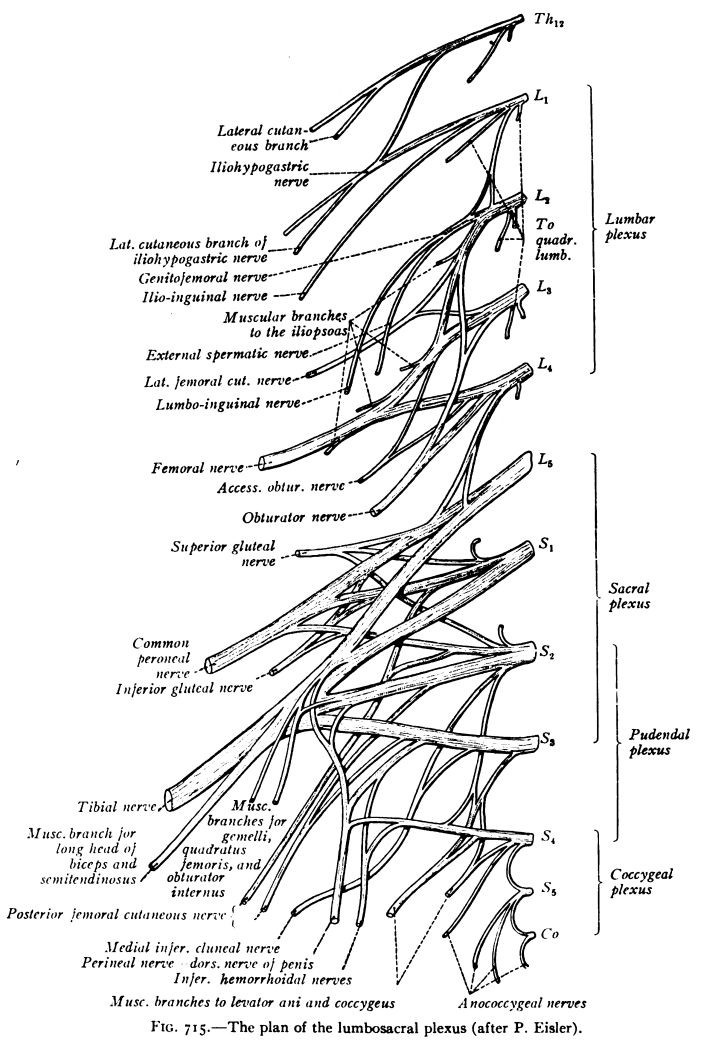
- The plan of the lumbosacral plexus

Details

Identifiers
- Latin: nervi spinalis
- FMA: 6167

The thoracic spinal nerve 12 (T12) is a spinal nerve of the thoracic segment.

It originates from the spinal column from below the thoracic vertebra 12 (T12).

It may also be known as the subcostal nerve.
