= Inferior cervical cardiac nerve =

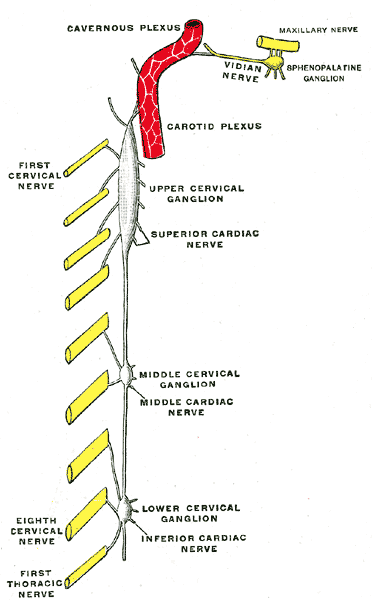
- Diagram of the cervical sympathetic. (Lower cervical ganglion labeled at bottom right.)

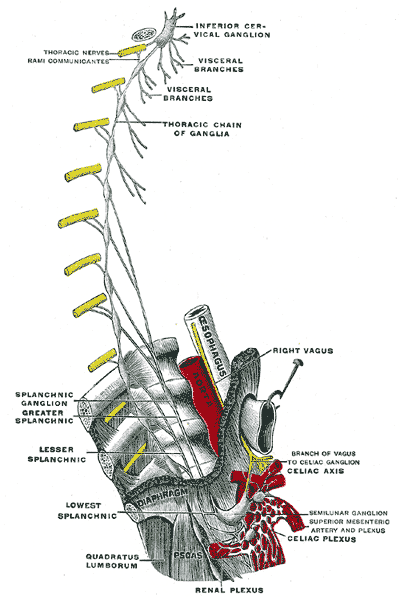
- Plan of right sympathetic cord and splanchnic nerves. (Inferior cervical ganglion labeled at upper right.)

Details
- To: Cardiac plexus
- Innervates: Heart

Identifiers
- Latin: nervus cardiacus cervicalis inferior

The inferior cervical cardiac nerve arises from the stellate ganglion (cervicothoracic gangion), or from the ansa subclavia of the cervical sympathetic trunk. It passes along the posterior aspect of the brachiocephalic trunk on the right side of the body, and of the internal carotid artery on the left side. It terminates by joining the deep cardiac plexus.

Posterior to the subclavian artery, it communicates freely with the recurrent nerve and the middle cardiac nerve.

== See also ==
- inferior cervical ganglion
- vagus nerve
