= Mediastinum =

Central part of the thoracic cavity

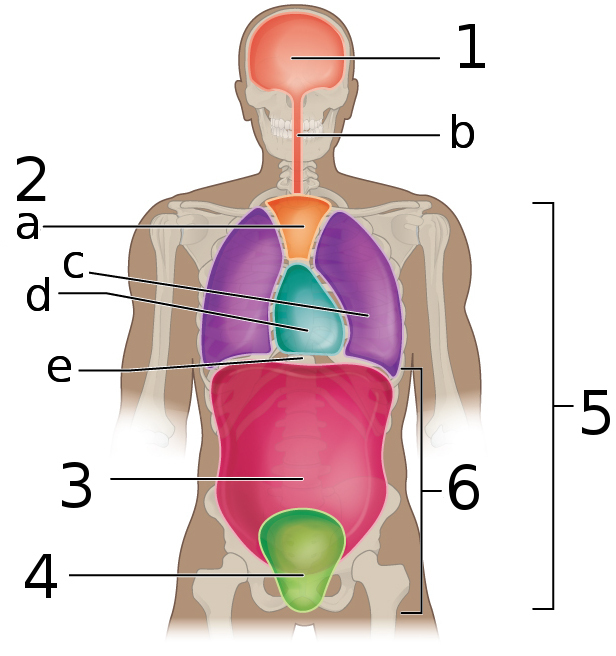
- Frontal view of the body cavities: superior mediastinum labeled a, and the pericardial cavity, which is part of the inferior mediastinum, labeled d

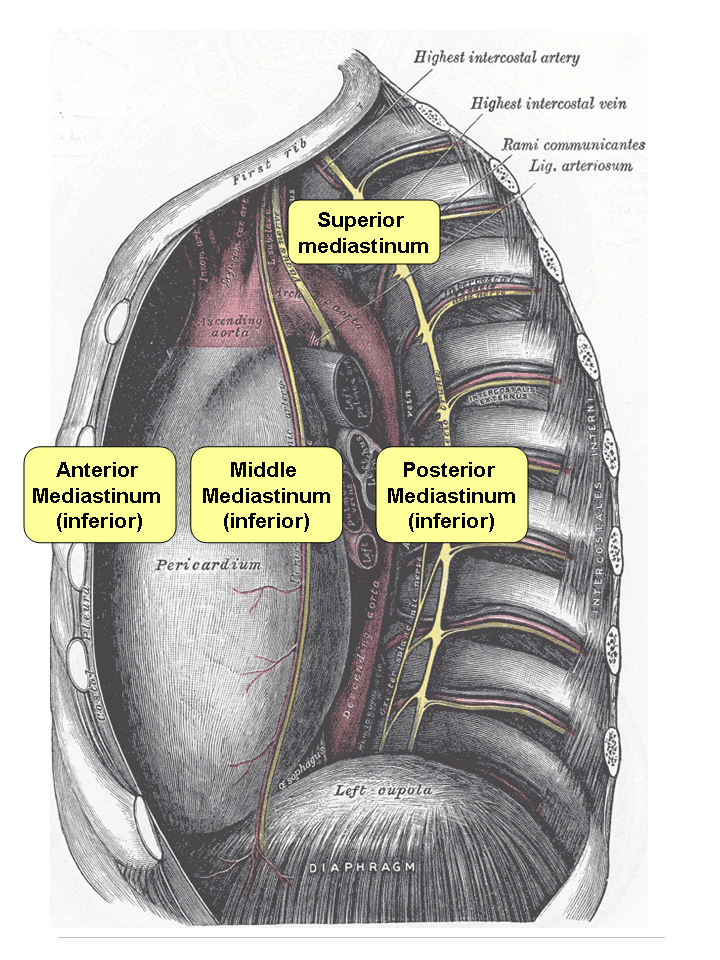
- Mediastinum, lateral view. The division between superior and inferior is at the sternal angle.

Details

Identifiers
- Latin: mediastinum
- MeSH: D008482
- TA98: A07.1.02.101
- TA2: 3333
- FMA: 9826

The mediastinum (from Medieval Latin: mediastinus, lit. 'midway';pl.: mediastina) is the central compartment of the thoracic cavity. Surrounded by loose connective tissue, it is a region that contains vital organs and structures within the thorax, mainly the heart and its vessels, the esophagus, the trachea, the vagus, phrenic and cardiac nerves, the thoracic duct, the thymus and the lymph nodes of the central chest.

== Anatomy ==
CT thorax (axial, mediastinal window)

The mediastinum lies within the thorax and is enclosed on the right and left by pleurae. It is surrounded by the chest wall in front, the lungs to the sides and the spine at the back. It extends from the sternum in front to the vertebral column behind. It contains all the organs of the thorax except the lungs. It is continuous with the loose connective tissue of the neck.

The mediastinum can be divided into an upper (or superior) and lower (or inferior) part:

- The superior mediastinum starts at the superior thoracic aperture and ends at the thoracic plane.
- The inferior mediastinum from this level to the diaphragm. This lower part is subdivided into three regions, all relative to the pericardium – the anterior mediastinum being in front of the pericardium, the middle mediastinum contains the pericardium and its contents, and the posterior mediastinum being behind the pericardium.

Anatomists, surgeons, and clinical radiologists compartmentalize the mediastinum differently. For instance, in the radiological scheme of Felson, there are only three compartments (anterior, middle, and posterior), and the heart is part of the middle (inferior) mediastinum.

=== Thoracic plane ===
The transverse thoracic plane, thoracic plane, plane of Louis or plane of Ludwig is an important anatomical plane at the level of the sternal angle and the T4/T5 intervertebral disc. It serves as an imaginary boundary that separates the superior and inferior mediastinum.

A number of important anatomical structures and transitions occur at the level of the thoracic plane, including:

- The carinal bifurcation of the trachea into the left and right main bronchi.
- The left recurrent laryngeal nerve branching off the left vagus nerve and hooking under the ligamentum arteriosum between the aortic arch above and the pulmonary trunk below.
- The starting of the cardiac plexus.
- The azygos vein arching over the right main bronchus and joining into the superior vena cava.
- The thoracic duct crossing the midline from right to left behind the esophagus
- The end of the pretracheal and prevertebral fasciae.

=== Superior mediastinum ===
The superior mediastinum is bounded:

- superiorly by the thoracic inlet, the upper opening of the thorax;
- inferiorly by the transverse thoracic plane. which is an imaginary plane passing from the sternal angle anteriorly to the lower border of the body of the 4th thoracic vertebra posteriorly;
- laterally by the pleurae;
- anteriorly by the manubrium of the sternum;
- posteriorly by the first four thoracic vertebral bodies.

Contents

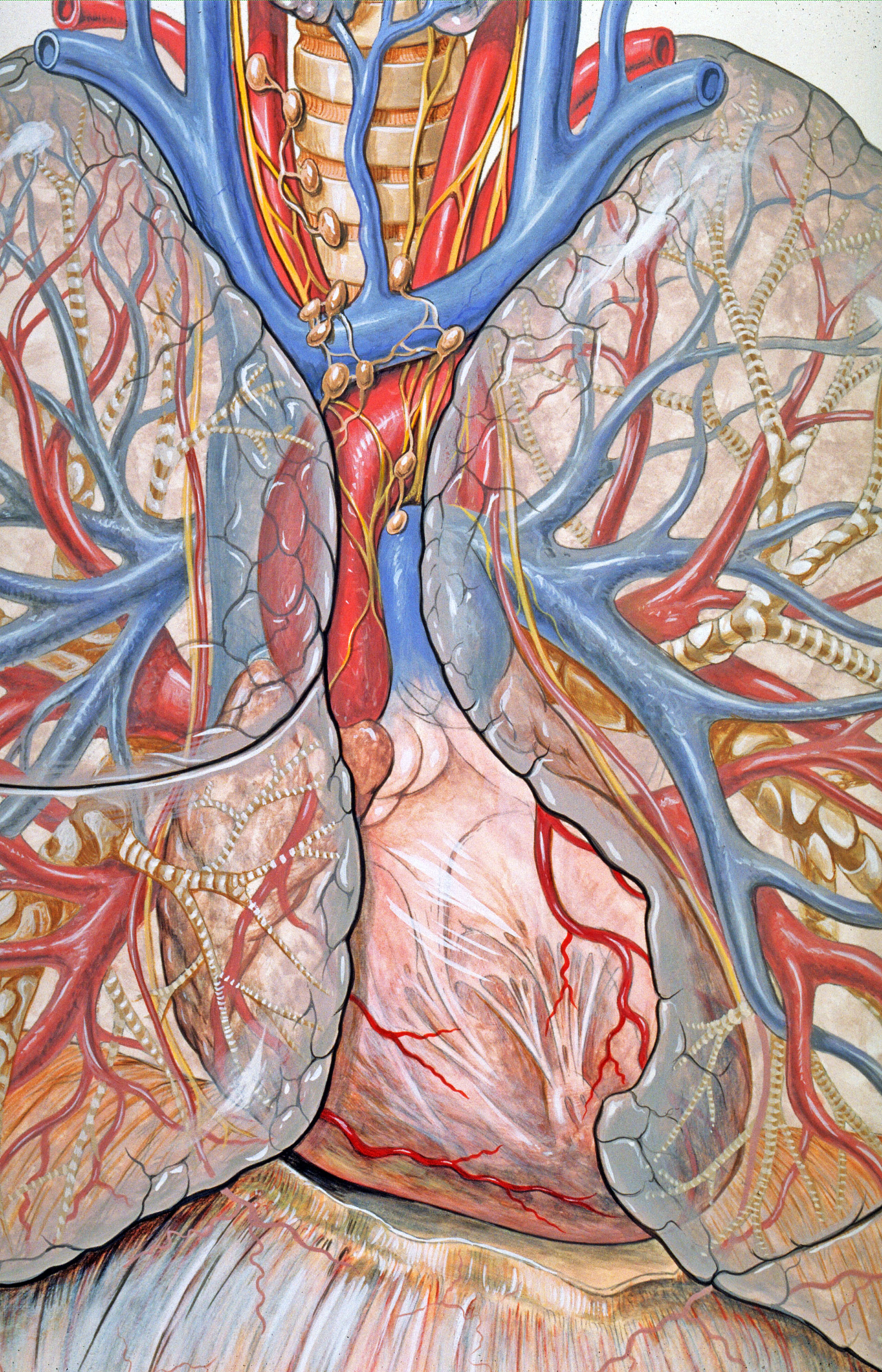
Mediastinum anatomy.

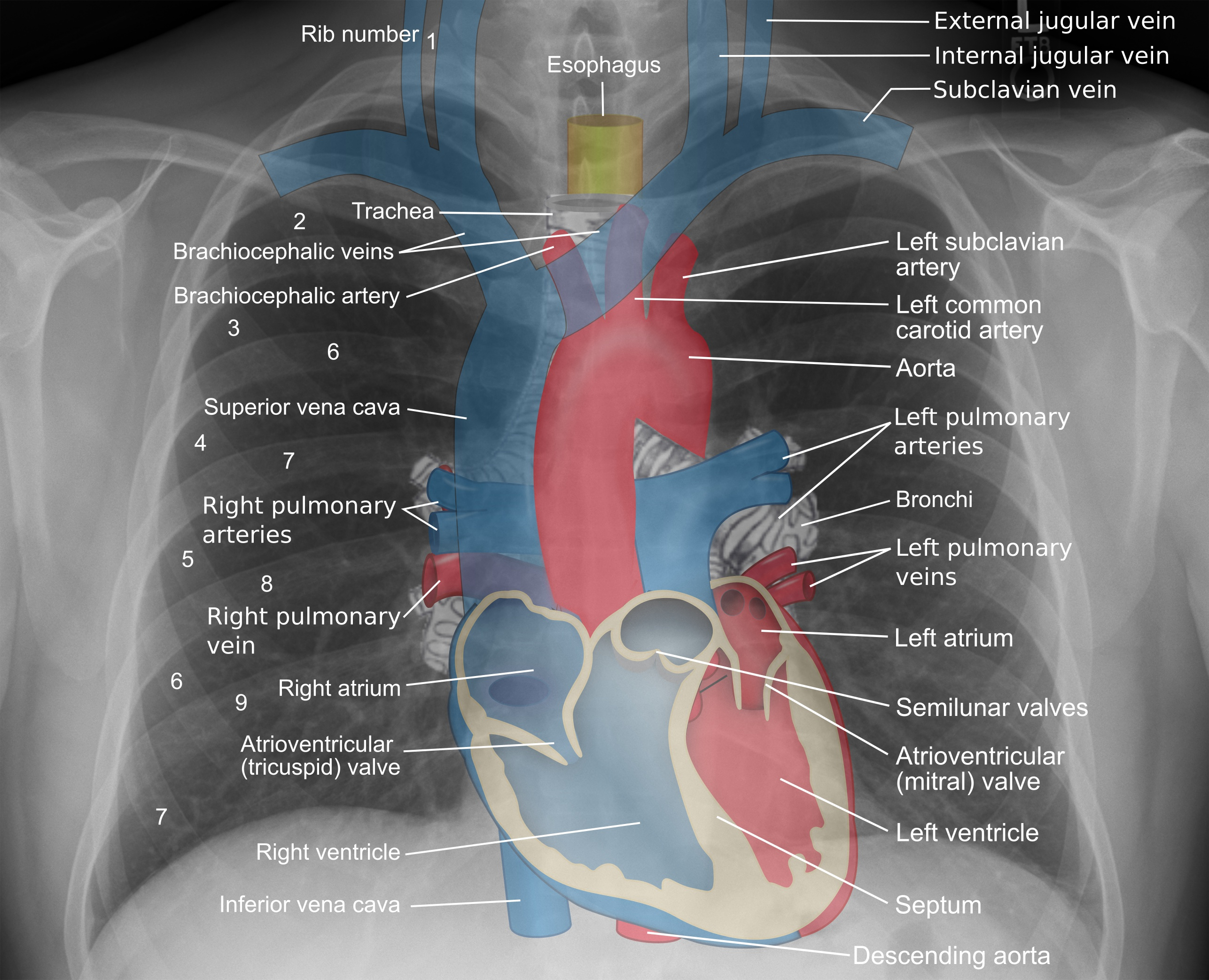
Some mediastinal structures on a chest radiograph.

Contents

- muscles
  - origins of the Sternohyoidei and Sternothyreoidei
  - lower ends of the Longi colli
- arteries
  - aortic arch
  - brachiocephalic artery
  - thoracic portions of the left common carotid and the left subclavian
- veins
  - brachiocephalic veins and
  - upper half of the superior vena cava
  - left highest intercostal vein
- nerves
  - vagus nerve
  - cardiac nerve
  - superficial and deep cardiac plexuses
  - phrenic nerve
  - left recurrent laryngeal nerve
- trachea with paratracheal and tracheobronchial lymph nodes
- esophagus
- thoracic duct
- remains of the thymus
- some lymph glands
- anterior longitudinal ligament

=== Inferior mediastinum ===
==== Anterior inferior mediastinum ====
Is bounded:

- laterally by the pleurae;
- posteriorly by the pericardium;
- anteriorly by the sternum, the left transversus thoracis and the fifth, sixth, and seventh left costal cartilages.

Contents

Contents

- A quantity of loose areolar tissue
- Some lymphatic vessels which ascend from the convex surface of the liver
- Two or three anterior mediastinal lymph nodes
- The small mediastinal branches of the internal thoracic artery
- Thymus (involuted in adults)
- superior and inferior sternopericardial ligaments

==== Middle inferior mediastinum ====
Bounded: pericardial sac – It contains the vital organs and is classified into the serous and fibrous pericardium.

Contents

Contents

- the heart enclosed in the pericardium
- the ascending aorta
- the lower half of the superior vena cava with the azygos vein opening into it
- the bifurcation of the trachea and the two bronchi
- the pulmonary trunk dividing into its two branches
- the right and left pulmonary veins
- the phrenic nerves
- some bronchial lymphatic glands
- pericardiacophrenic vessels

==== Posterior inferior mediastinum ====
Is bounded:

- Anteriorly by (from above downwards): bifurcation of trachea; pulmonary vessels; fibrous pericardium and posterior sloping surface of diaphragm
- Inferiorly by the thoracic surface of the diaphragm (below);
- Superiorly by the transverse thoracic plane;
- Posteriorly by the bodies of the vertebral column from the lower border of the fifth to the twelfth thoracic vertebra (behind);
- Laterally by the mediastinal pleura (on either side).

Contents
- artery
  - thoracic part of the descending aorta
- veins
  - azygos vein
  - the hemiazygos vein and the accessory hemiazygos vein
- nerves
  - vagus nerve
  - splanchnic nerves
  - sympathetic chain
- esophagus
- thoracic duct
- some lymph glands

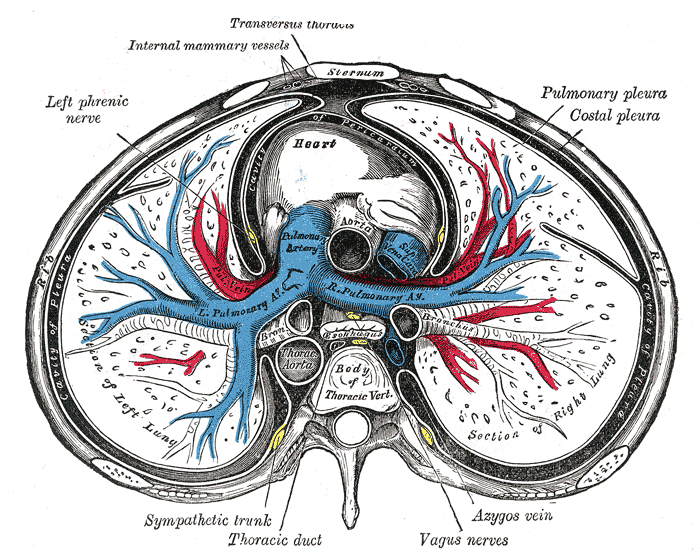
A transverse section of the thorax, showing the contents of the middle and the posterior mediastinum.

== Clinical significance ==
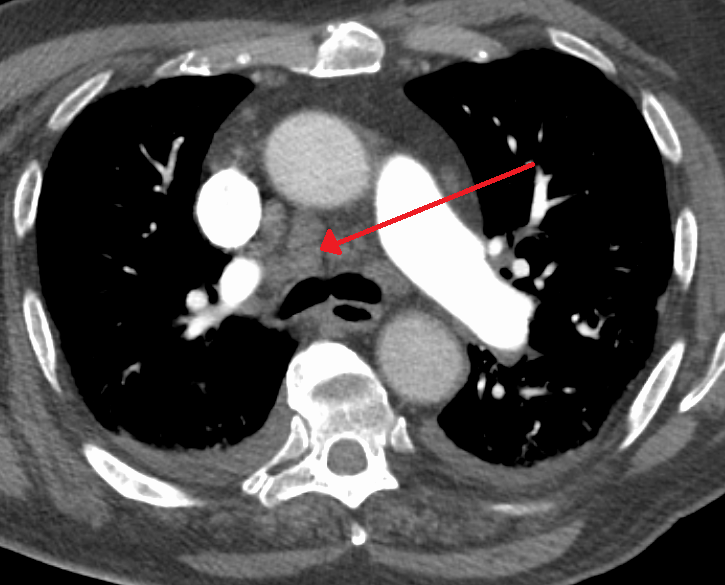
Mediastinal adenopathy

The mediastinum is frequently the site of involvement of various tumors:

- Anterior mediastinum: substernal thyroid goiters, lymphoma, thymoma, and teratoma.
- Middle mediastinum: lymphadenopathy, metastatic disease such as from small cell carcinoma from the lung.
- Posterior mediastinum: Neurogenic tumors, either from the nerve sheath (mostly benign) or elsewhere (mostly malignant).

Mediastinitis is inflammation of the tissues in the mediastinum, usually bacterial and due to rupture of organs in the mediastinum. As the infection can progress very quickly, this is a serious condition.

Pneumomediastinum is the presence of air in the mediastinum, which in some cases can lead to pneumothorax, pneumoperitoneum, and pneumopericardium if left untreated. However, that does not always occur and sometimes those conditions are actually the cause, not the result, of pneumomediastinum. These conditions frequently accompany Boerhaave syndrome, or spontaneous esophageal rupture.

=== Widening ===
Widened mediastinum
- Other names: Mediastinal widening
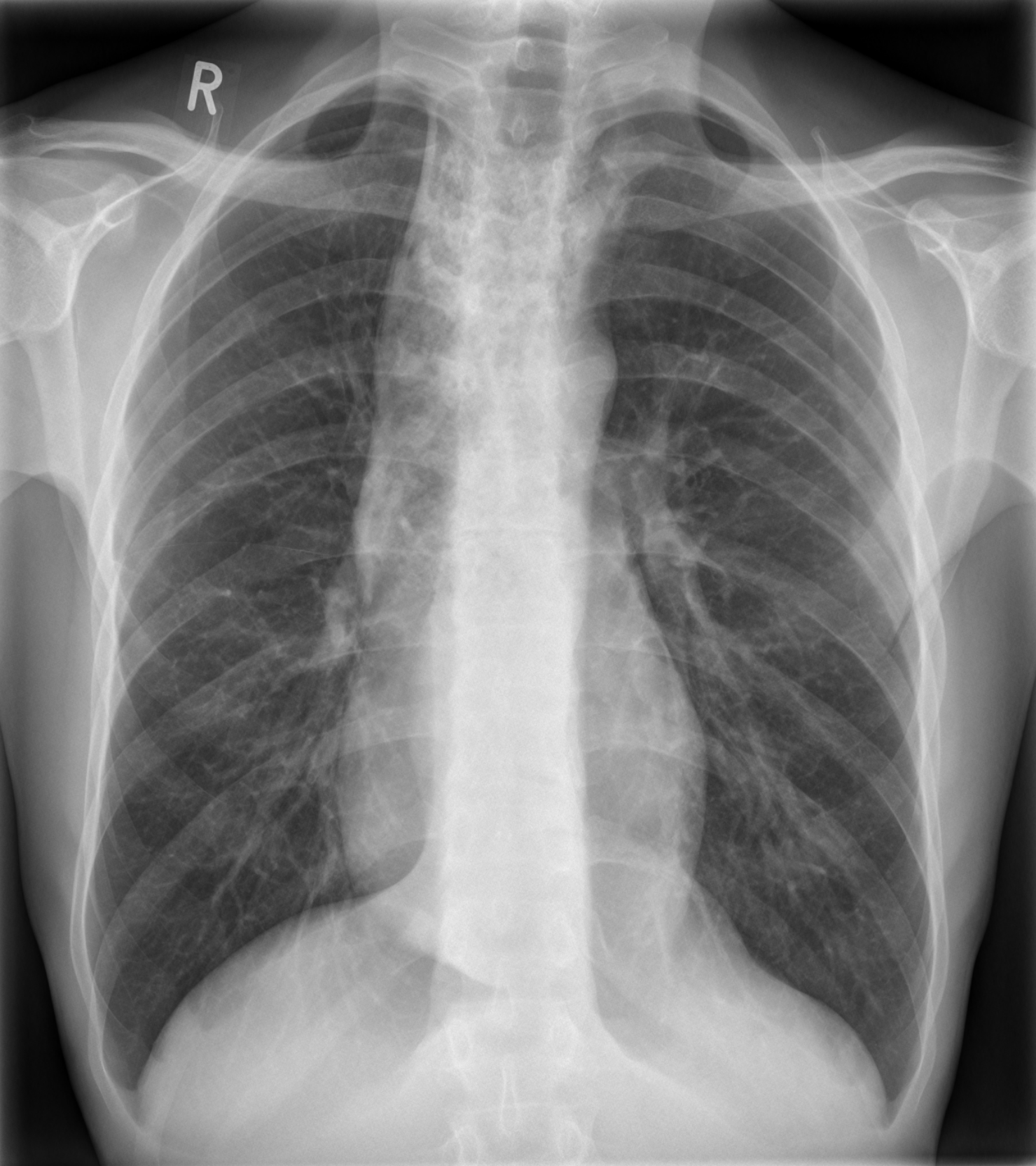
- Widened mediastinum in a patient with achalasia

Widened mediastinum/mediastinal widening is where the mediastinum has a width greater than 6 cm on an upright PA chest X-ray or 8 cm on supine AP chest film.

A widened mediastinum can be indicative of several pathologies:

- aortic aneurysm
- aortic dissection
- aortic unfolding
- aortic rupture
- hilar lymphadenopathy
- anthrax inhalation - a widened mediastinum was found in 7 of the first 10 victims infected by anthrax (Bacillus anthracis) in 2001.
- esophageal rupture - presents usually with pneumomediastinum and pleural effusion. It is diagnosed with water-soluble swallowed contrast.
- mediastinal mass
- mediastinitis
- cardiac tamponade
- pericardial effusion
- thoracic vertebrae fractures in trauma patients.

== See also ==
- Mediastinum testis (unrelated structure in the scrotum)
- Mediastinal germ cell tumor
- Mediastinitis
- Mediastinal tumor
- List of anatomy mnemonics#Mediastinum
