= Inferior ganglion =

Inferior ganglion may refer to:

- Inferior cervical ganglion
- Inferior cervical sympathetic ganglion
- Inferior ganglion of vagus nerve
- Inferior ganglion of glossopharyngeal nerve
- Inferior mesenteric ganglion
