= Superior cardiac nerve =

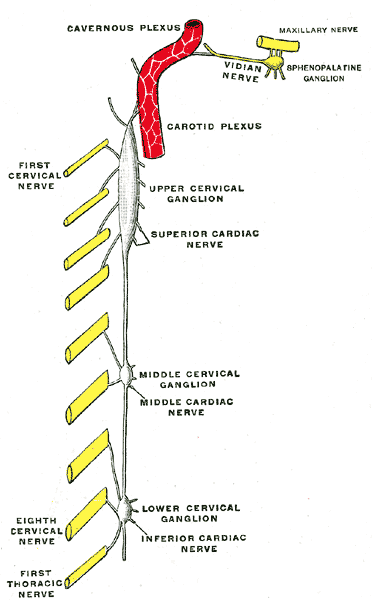
- Diagram of the cervical sympathetic. (Superior cardiac nerve labeled at center right.)

Details
- From: Superior cervical ganglion
- Innervates: Heart

Identifiers
- Latin: nervus cardiacus cervicalis superior

The superior cardiac nerve arises by two or more branches from the superior cervical ganglion, and occasionally receives a filament from the trunk between the first and second cervical ganglia. It runs down the neck behind the common carotid artery, and in front of the Longus colli muscle; and crosses in front of the inferior thyroid artery, and recurrent nerve. The course of the nerves on the two sides then differs.

== Right nerve ==
The right nerve, at the root of the neck, passes either in front of or behind the subclavian artery, and along the brachiocephalic trunk to the back of the arch of the aorta, where it joins the deep part of the cardiac plexus.

It is connected with other branches of the sympathetic; about the middle of the neck it receives filaments from the external laryngeal nerve; lower down, one or two twigs from the vagus; and as it enters the thorax it is joined by a filament from the recurrent laryngeal nerve.

Filaments from the nerve communicate with the thyroid branches from the middle cervical ganglion.

== Left nerve ==
The left nerve, in the thorax, runs in front of the left common carotid artery and across the left side of the aortic arch, to the superficial part of the cardiac plexus.
