= Inferior cervical ganglion =

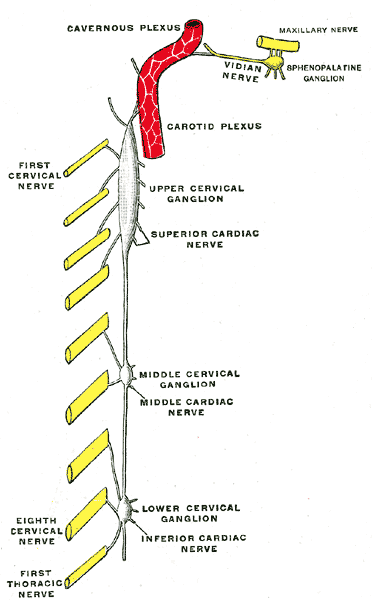
- Diagram of the cervical sympathetic. ("Lower cervical ganglion" labeled at bottom right.)

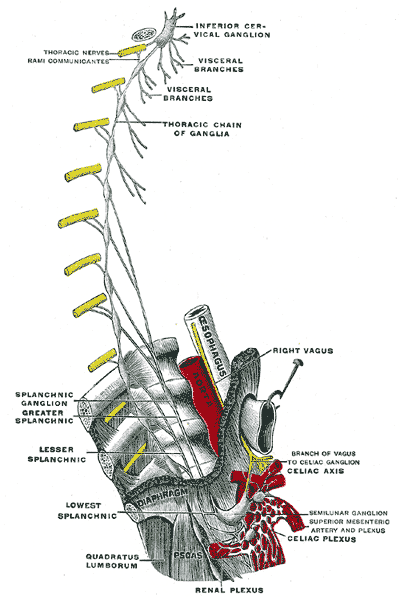
- Plan of right sympathetic cord and splanchnic nerves. (Inferior cervical ganglion labeled at upper right.)

Details
- Innervates: Thyroid

Identifiers
- Latin: ganglion cervicale inferius
- TA98: A14.3.01.019
- TA2: 6611
- FMA: 6961

The inferior cervical ganglion is one of the three cervical sympathetic ganglia (i.e. of the cervical portion of the sympathetic trunk). It is situated between the base of the transverse process of the last cervical vertebra and the neck of the first rib, on the medial side of the costocervical artery.

It is often united with the first (and sometimes the second) thoracic ganglion to form the cervicothoracic ganglion (stellate ganglion).

== Anatomy ==
The inferior cervical ganglion is irregularly shaped. It is substantially larger than the middle cervical ganglion (but smaller than the superior cervical ganglion). As the sympathetic trunk curves posteriorly between the neck and thorax, this ganglion is oriented in a nearly anteroposterior axis.

The ganglion is presumed to represent the union of the cervical segmental sympathetic ganglia C7-C8 and the thoracic segmental sympathetic ganglia T1, but sometimes up to T4 as well - the T1 ganglion may or may not be separate to leave a distinct inferior cervical ganglion. The gray rami communicantes of the inferior cervical ganglion join the cervical nerves C7-C8.

=== Relations ===
The ganglion is situated posterior to the commencement of the vertebral artery.

==== Communicating cords ====
The inferior cervical ganglion and middle cervical ganglion are connected by two (an anterior one and a posterior one) or more highly variable cords. The posterior cord typically splits to surround the vertebral artery; the anterior cord loops around the subclavian artery, forming the ansa subclavia.

=== Branches ===
The inferior cervical ganglion gives off two branches:

- The Inferior cardiac nerve
- offsets to blood vessels form plexuses on the subclavian artery and its branches. The plexus on the vertebral artery is continued on to the basilar, posterior cerebral, and cerebellar arteries. The plexus on the inferior thyroid artery accompanies the artery to the thyroid gland, and communicates with the recurrent and external laryngeal nerves, with the superior cardiac nerve, and with the plexus on the common carotid artery.

=== Development ===
It is probably formed by the coalescence of two ganglia which correspond to the seventh and eighth cervical nerves.

== Additional images ==
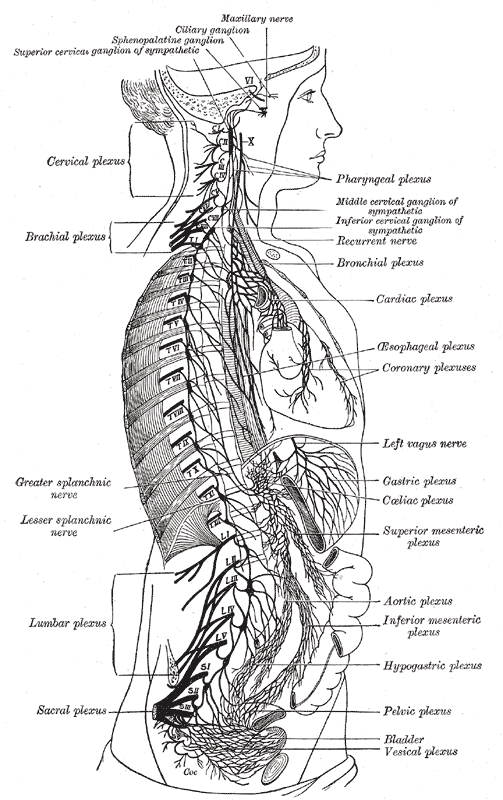
The right sympathetic chain and its connections with the thoracic, abdominal, and pelvic plexuses.

== See also ==
- Cervical spine
