= Subclavian loop =

Nerve near the collarbone

Details

Identifiers
- Latin: ansa subclavia
- TA98: A14.3.01.021
- TA2: 6624
- FMA: 6582

Subclavian loop (ansa subclavia), also known as Vieussens' ansa after French anatomist Raymond Vieussens (1635-1715), is a nerve cord that is a connection between the middle and inferior cervical ganglion which is commonly fused with the first thoracic ganglion and is then called the stellate ganglion. The subclavian ansa forms a loop around the subclavian artery; whence its name. This communicating branch downwards anteromedial to the vertebral artery makes a loop around the subclavian artery from anterior to posterior and then lies medially to the internal thoracic artery respectively. Sometimes there are two communicating branches encompassing the vertebral artery, one from anterior and the other from posterior.
