= Mediastinal germ cell tumor =

- Specialty: Oncology

Mediastinal germ cell tumors are tumors that derive from germ cell rest remnants in the mediastinum. Germ cell tumors most commonly occur in the gonad but occasionally elsewhere.

== Signs and symptoms ==
Unlike benign germ cell tumors of the mediastinum, malignant mediastinal tumors are usually symptomatic at the time of diagnosis. Most mediastinal malignant tumors are large and cause symptoms by compressing or invading adjacent structures, including the lungs, pleura, pericardium, and chest wall.

Seminomas grow relatively slowly and can become very large before causing symptoms. Tumors 20 to 30 cm in diameter can exist with minimal symptomatology.

Rare cases of adult onset acute megakaryoblastic leukemia are associated with malignant mediastinal germ cell tumor. In these cases, the mediastinal germ cell tumor develops before or concomitantly with but not after acute megakaryoblastic leukemia. The three most common genetic aberrations in the bone marrow cells of these individuals (representing ~65% of all cases) are inversions in the long arm of chromosome 12, trisomy 8, and an extra X chromosome. In several of these cases, the genetic aberrations in the malignant megakaryoblasts were similar to those in the malignant mediastinal germ cells. These results and those of other analyses suggest that the two malignancies derive from a common founding clone of cells (i.e. a set of genetically identical cells).

== Cause ==
Some investigators suggest that this distribution arises as a consequence of abnormal migration of germ cells during embryogenesis. Others hypothesize a widespread distribution of germ cells to multiple sites during normal embryogenesis, with these cells conveying genetic information or providing regulatory functions at somatic sites.

== Diagnosis ==
The diagnosis of a mediastinal germ cell tumor should be considered in all young males with a mediastinal mass. In addition to physical examination and routine laboratory studies, initial evaluation should include CT of the chest and abdomen, and determination of serum levels of HCG and alpha-fetoprotein.

== Treatment ==
Pure mediastinal seminomas are curable in the large majority of patients, even when metastatic at the time of diagnosis. These tumors are highly sensitive to radiation therapy and combination chemotherapy. However, the cardiotoxicity of mediastinal radiation is substantial and the standard treatment of mediastinal seminomas is with chemotherapy using bleomycin, etoposide and cisplatin for either three or four 21-day treatment cycles depending on the location of any metastatic disease. Patients with small tumors (usually asymptomatic) that appear resectable usually undergo thoracotomy and attempted complete resection followed by chemotherapy.

The treatment for mediastinal nonseminomatous germ cell tumors should follow guidelines for poor-prognosis testicular cancer. Initial treatment with four courses of bleomycin, etoposide, and cisplatin, followed by surgical resection of any residual disease, is considered standard therapy.

== Epidemiology ==
Malignant germ cell tumors of the mediastinum are uncommon, representing only 3 to 10% of tumors originating in the mediastinum. They are much less common than germ cell tumors arising in the testes, and account for only 1 to 5% of all germ cell neoplasms.

Syndromes associated with mediastinal germ cell tumors include Hematologic Neoplasia and Klinefelter's syndrome.

== History ==
Malignant mediastinal germ cell tumors of various histologies were first described as a clinical entity approximately 50 years ago. Mediastinal and other extragonadal germ cell tumors were initially thought to represent isolated metastases from an inapparent gonadal primary site.

== See also ==
- Mediastinitis
- Mediastinal fibrosis
- Mediastinum
