= Raymond Vieussens =

French anatomist (1635–1715)

- Raymond de Vieussens.
- Born: 1641
- Died: 16 August 1715
- Occupation: Medical doctor

Raymond Vieussens (ca. 1635 – 16 August 1715) was a French anatomist from Le Vigan then in the province of Quercy. There is uncertainty regarding the exact year of Vieussens birth, with some sources placing it as late as 1641.

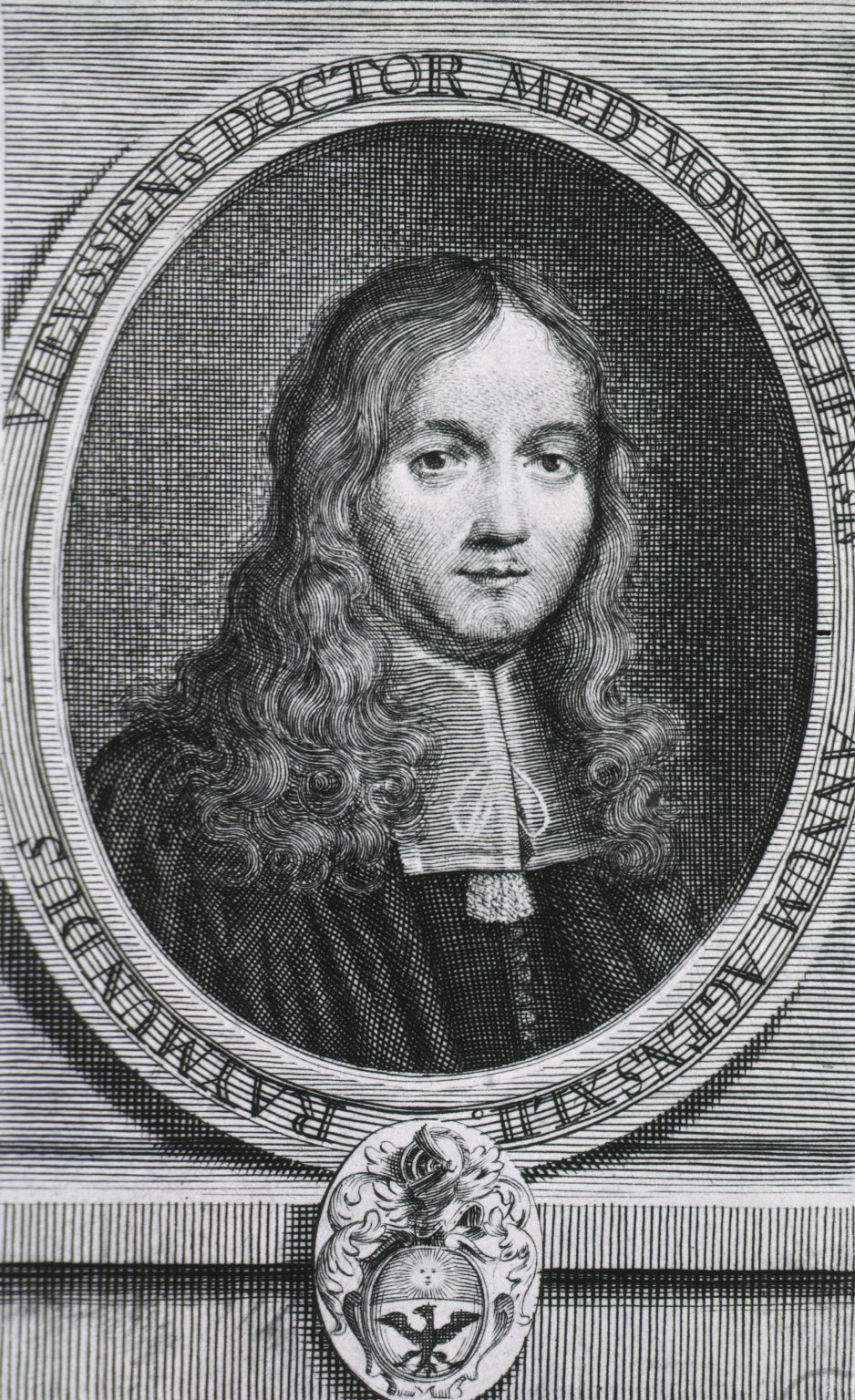
Portrait of Raymond Vieussens

He studied medicine at the University of Montpellier where he earned his degree in 1670. He later became head physician at Hôtel Dieu Saint-Eloi in Montpellier.

Vieussens is remembered for his pioneer work in the field of cardiology, and his anatomical studies of the brain and spinal cord. He regarded English anatomist Thomas Willis (1621–1675) as a major influence towards his career.

Vieussens is credited as being the first physician to give accurate descriptions of the left ventricle and several blood vessels of the heart. He was also the first to give a comprehensive description of mitral stenosis, as well as other types of heart disease and circulatory disorders.

He also provided an early description of the brain's centrum semiovale, which is sometimes referred to as "Vieussens' centrum". This structure is also known as "Vicq d'Azyr's centrum", named after Félix Vicq-d'Azyr (1746–1794), who provided a later, more detailed description.

Several other anatomical structures are named after Vieussens; however, they have largely been replaced by clinical nomenclature. These include:

- "Vieussens' valve" (superior medullary velum)
- "Vieussens' ventricle" (cavity of septum pellucidum)
- "Vieussens' ansa" (subclavian loop)
- "Vieussens' ganglia" (celiac ganglia)
- "Vieussens' isthmus" (limbus of fossa ovalis) and
- "Vieussens' veins" (innominate cardiac veins).

He also provided an early description of the tiny openings in the veins of the right atrium of the heart that are known as "Vieussens' foramina", or foramina venarum minimarum, and sometimes "Thebesian foramina" after Adam Christian Thebesius (1686–1732).

Another important finding named after him in the field of cardiology is the vieussens collateral (Vieussens ring in cardiac literature), that is an arterial relation between the proximal part of the right coronary artery (RCA) to the left anterior descending artery (LAD), providing some blood flow for the myocardium distal to the coronary lesion in the LAD. This collateral blood supply reduces ischemia and protects that part of myocardium from complete necrosis.

Among his written works are Neurographia universalis, an early work on neuroanatomy that is known for its excellent copperplate illustrations, and Novum vasorum corporis humani systema, an important treatise on the anatomy and diseases of the heart.

During his lifetime, Vieussens was known for his controversial views on human physiology, which speculatively went beyond what the scientific evidence would have sanctioned at that time.

== Selected works ==
- Neurographia universalis, (General neurography) (1684)
- Vieussens's Tractatus duo, (treatise on two subjects) (1688)
- Epistola de sanguinis humani, (an article on human blood) (1698)
- Deux dissertations, (two dissertations) (1698)
- Novum vasorum corporis humani systema, (Vessels of the human body; considered an early classic work of cardiology) (1705)
- 1706- the Structure of human heart.
- Dissertatio anatomica de structura et usu uteri ac placentae muliebris, (Anatomical study on the structure of the uterus and placenta) (1712)
- Traité nouveau de la structure de l'oreille, (Treatise on the structure of the ear) (1714)
- Traité nouveau des liqueurs du corps humain (1715)
- Traité nouveau de la structure et des causes du mouvement naturel du coeur, (Treatise on the structure of the heart and the causes of its natural motion) (1715)
