= Sternal angle =

Aspect of human anatomy

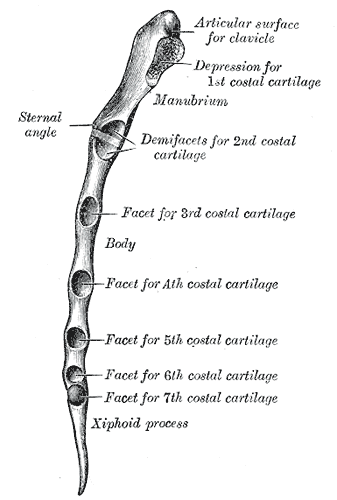
- Lateral border of sternum

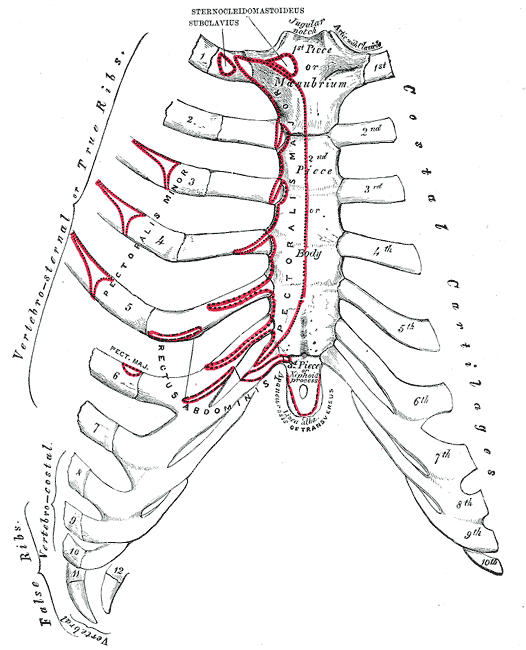
- Anterior surface of sternum and costal cartilages. (Sternal angle not labeled, but visible at second costal cartilage.)

Details

Identifiers
- Latin: angulus sterni, angulus sternalis, angulus Ludovici
- TA98: A02.3.03.005
- TA2: 1133
- FMA: 7547

The sternal angle (also known as the angle of Lewis, angle of Louis, angle of Ludovic, or manubriosternal junction) is the projecting angle formed between the manubrium and body of a sternum at their junction at the manubriosternal joint.

The sternal angle is a palpable and visible landmark in surface anatomy, presenting as either a slight body ridge or depression upon the upper chest wall which corresponds to the underlying manubriosternal joint. The sternal angle is palpable and often visible in young people.

The sternal angle corresponds to the level of the 2nd costal cartilage on either side, and the level between the fourth and fifth thoracic vertebra. The sternal angle is used to define the transverse thoracic plane which represents the imaginary boundary between the superior and inferior mediastinum. It is also used to identify the second rib during physical examination and then the rest of the ribs by counting.

== Anatomy ==
The sternal angle forms an angle of about 162° in males.

=== Relations ===
It marks the approximate level of the 2nd pair of costal cartilages, (sources differ) the level of the intervertebral disc between thoracic vertebra T4-T5 or the lower border of the thoracic vertebra T4, and the space between the spinous processes of thoracic vertebrae T3-T4. The horizontal plane that passes through the sternal angle and the articular disc between the 4th and 5th thoracic vertebrae (the so-called plane of Louis) represents the imaginary boundary between the superior mediastinum and inferior mediastinum.

It is located approximately 7 cm inferior to the superior margin of the manubrium.

The sternal angle is used in the definition of the thoracic plane.

The angle also marks the level of a number of features:

- Boundary between the superior and inferior portion of the mediastinum
- Passage of the thoracic duct from right to left behind esophagus
- Tracheal bifurcation. The carina of the trachea is thus, present here. It is deep to the sternal angle.
- The bifurcation of the pulmonary trunk
- The superior limit of the fibrous pericardium surrounding the ascending aorta
- Termination of the azygos vein into the superior vena cava
- Ligamentum arteriosum
- Loop of left recurrent laryngeal nerve around aortic arch
- The beginning and end of the aortic arch

== Clinical significance ==
The sternal angle is the most frequent site of sternal fracture among elderly people.

=== Surface anatomy and physical examination ===
The sternal angle marks the point at which the costal cartilage of either second rib articulates with the sternum. During physical examinations, the readily palpated sternal angle is thus used as a landmark to identify the 2nd rib, and by extension, by counting, also the remaining ribs. Meanwhile, the first rib cannot be used for this purpose because it cannot be palpated. Counting ribs is essential attempting to make a thoracic incision; an incision at the first or second rib interspace can result in damage to large, important blood vessels and the brachial plexus. Identification of the second rib and thus the second intercostal space inferiorly is useful when auscultating heart sounds. The optimal location for auscultation of the aortic valve is generally the right second intercostal space, whereas the optimal location for auscultation of the pulmonic valve is generally the left second intercostal space.

The sternal angle is used as the starting point in physical examinations of the heart since the sternal angle is located 5 cm superior to the right atrium.

== History ==
The sternal angle is also called the angle of Louis, but the reason for that name was lost. Once thought to be after Antoine Louis or Wilhelm Friedrich von Ludwig, it is now believed to be after Pierre Charles Alexandre Louis.

== See also ==
- Thoracic plane
- List of medical mnemonics
