= Cardiac nerve =

Group of nerves supplying the heart

The cardiac nerves are autonomic nerves which supply the heart. They include:

- Superior cardiac nerve (nervus cardiacus cervicalis superior)
- Middle cardiac nerve (nervus cardiacus cervicalis medius)
- Inferior cardiac nerve (nervus cardiacus inferior)

== Anatomy ==
The nerves go down to the root of the neck with these following association:

Posterior: "prevertebral fascia overlying anterolateral surface of vertebral bodies"

Superior: "common carotid artery"

Inferior: "subclavian artery"

Laterally: "sympathetic trunk"
