= Cardiac branches of the vagus nerve =

Nerve branches in the upper torso

The cardiac branches of the vagus nerve are two sets of nerves found in the upper torso, close to the larynx. The specific branches are the cervical cardiac branches of vagus nerve and the thoracic cardiac branches of vagus nerve.

== Cervical cardiac branches of vagus nerve ==
Cervical cardiac branches of vagus nerve

Details

Identifiers
- Latin: Rami cardiaci cervicales nervi vagi

The cervical cardiac branches (sometimes ambiguously called superior cardiac branches) of vagus nerve, two or three in number, arise from the vagus, at the upper and lower parts of the neck.

- The upper branches are small, and communicate with the cardiac branches of the sympathetic. They can be traced to the deep part of the cardiac plexus.
- The lower branch arises at the root of the neck, just above the first rib. That from the right vagus passes in front or by the side of the innominate artery, and proceeds to the deep part of the cardiac plexus; that from the left runs down across the left side of the aortic arch, and joins the superficial part of the cardiac plexus.

== Thoracic cardiac branches of vagus nerve ==
Thoracic cardiac branches of vagus nerve

Details

Identifiers
- Latin: Rami cardiaci thoracici nervi vagi

The thoracic cardiac branches (sometimes ambiguously called inferior cardiac branches) of vagus nerve, on the right side, arise from the trunk of the vagus as it lies by the side of the trachea, and from its recurrent nerve; on the left side from the recurrent nerve only; passing inward, they end in the deep part of the cardiac plexus.
