= Middle cervical cardiac nerve =

Middle cardiac nerve
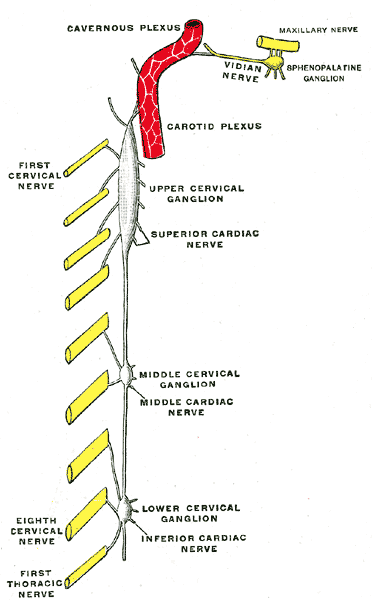
- Diagram of the cervical sympathetic.

Details
- From: Middle cervical ganglion

Identifiers
- Latin: nervus cardiacus cervicalis medius

The middle cervical cardiac nerve (or great cardiac nerve) is the largest of the three cardiac nerves. It arises from the middle cervical ganglion, or directly from the sympathetic trunk. It joins the deep cardiac plexus. It may occasionally be absent.

== Anatomy ==
=== Course ===
On the right side it descends posterior to the common carotid artery, and at the root of the neck runs either anterior or posterior to the subclavian artery; it then descends upon the trachea, receives a few filaments from the recurrent nerve, finally joining the right half of the deep cardiac plexus.

On the left side, the middle cardiac nerve enters the chest between the left carotid and the left subclavian artery, and joins the left half of the deep part of the cardiac plexus.

=== Anastomoses ===
In the neck, it communicates with the superior cardiac and recurrent nerves.

== See also ==
- Middle cervical ganglion
