= Aortic unfolding =

Pattern seen during radiologic examination

Aortic unfolding is an abnormality visible on a chest X-ray, that shows widening of the mediastinum which may mimic the appearance of a thoracic aortic aneurysm.

With aging, the ascending portion of the thoracic aorta increases in length by approximately 12% per decade, whereas the diameter increases by just 3% per decade. This elongation causes the ascending aorta to appear as a vertical shadow on the left heart border. Unfolding is often associated with aortic calcification which implies aortic degeneration and hypertension.
