= Vagusstoff =

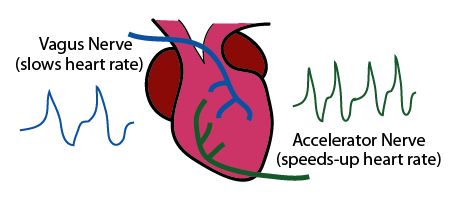
Figure 1. Diagram of the frog heart preparation used by Loewi. Vagus nerve stimulation slows heart rate while accelerator (sympathetic) nerve stimulation speeds up heart rate.

Vagusstoff (literally translated from German as "Vagus Substance") refers to the substance released by stimulation of the vagus nerve which causes a reduction in the heart rate. Discovered in 1921 by physiologist Otto Loewi, vagusstoff was the first confirmation of chemical synaptic transmission and the first neurotransmitter ever discovered. It was later confirmed to be acetylcholine, which was first identified by Sir Henry Hallett Dale in 1914. Because of his pioneering experiments, in 1936 Loewi was awarded the Nobel Prize in Physiology or Medicine, which he shared with Dale.

== The discovery of Vagusstoff ==
By the time Loewi began his experiments there was much discussion among scientists whether communication between nerves and muscles was chemical or electrical by nature. Experiments by Luigi Galvani in the 18th century had demonstrated that electrical stimulation of the frog sciatic nerve resulted in twitching of the leg muscles, and from this he developed the concept of bioelectricity. This led to the idea that direct electrical contact between nerves and muscles mediated transmission of excitation. However, work by John Newport Langley had suggested that in the autonomic nervous system communication in the ciliary ganglion was chemical. Loewi's experiments, published in 1921, finally settled the issue, proving that synaptic transmission was chemical.

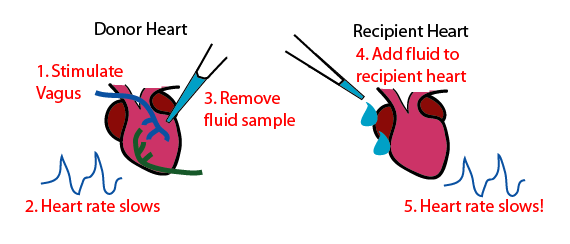
Figure 2. Loewi's experiment proving that neurotransmision was chemical, rather than electrical.

Loewi performed a very simple yet elegant experiment. Using an isolated frog heart he had previously found that stimulation of the vagus nerve resulted in a slowing of the heart rate, while stimulation of the sympathetic nerve caused the heart rate to speed up (Figure 1). He reasoned that stimulation of either the vagus or sympathetic nerve would cause the nerve terminal to release a substance which would either slow or accelerate the heart rate. To prove this, he took a frog heart, which had been cannulated in order to perfuse the fluid surrounding the heart, and electrically stimulated the vagus nerve until the heart rate slowed. He then collected the fluid surrounding the heart and added it to a second frog heart which had been stripped of its vagal and sympathetic nerves. By adding the fluid surrounding the first heart to the second heart, he caused the heart rate of the second heart to slow down. This proved that stimulation of the vagus nerve caused the release of a substance which acted upon the heart tissue and directly caused the heart rate to slow down. (Figure 2) This substance was called vagusstoff. Vagustoff was later confirmed to be acetylcholine and was found to be the principal neurotransmitter in the parasympathetic nervous system.

Original records from Loewi's experiment in 1921. Saline from the stimulated heart was added to the unstimulated heart whenever the number "2" is indicated in the graph.

In an interesting aside, Loewi apparently had the idea for his experiment in a dream. He wrote it down in the middle of the night but the next morning could not decipher his writing. He eventually had the same dream on another night, and decided to run to the laboratory to perform the experiment in the middle of the night. About this incident, Loewi writes:

On mature consideration, in the cold light of the morning, I would not have done it. After all, it was an unlikely enough assumption that the vagus should secrete an inhibitory substance; it was still more unlikely that a chemical substance that was supposed to be effective at very close range between nerve terminal and muscle be secreted in such large amounts that it would spill over and, after being diluted by the perfusion fluid, still be able to inhibit another heart. (Loewi 1921)

Loewi was fortunate in his choice of experimental preparation. In the species of frog used (Rana esculenta), the vagus contains both inhibitory and stimulatory fibers. In the winter, inhibitory fibers predominate, so Loewi was also fortunate to have performed his experiments in February or March. Additionally, acetylcholinesterase activity (the enzyme that degrades acetylcholine) is low, particularly in an unheated laboratory, allowing the neurotransmitter to remain long enough to be collected and applied to a second heart. Thanks to this confluence of events, Loewi was able to describe the existence of vagusstoff and prove the existence of chemical synaptic transmission.

== See also ==
- Acetylcholine
- Otto Loewi
- Vagus nerve
- Synapse

== Sources ==
- Loewi, O. (1921). "Über humorale Übertragbarkeit der Herznervenwirkung. I.". Pflügers Archiv. 189: 239–242. doi:10.1007/BF01731235.
- Bennett, M.R. (2000). "The concept of transmitter receptors: 100 years on". Neuropharmacology. 39 (4): 523–46. doi:10.1016/s0028-3908(99)00137-9. PMID 10728874.
- J.G. Nicholls, A.R. Martin, B.G. Wallace and P.A. Fuchs. "From Neuron to Brain". 4th ed. Sinauer Associates, Sunderland, MA. ISBN 0-87893-439-1
