= Mediastinitis =

Inflammation of the mediastinum (middle chest)

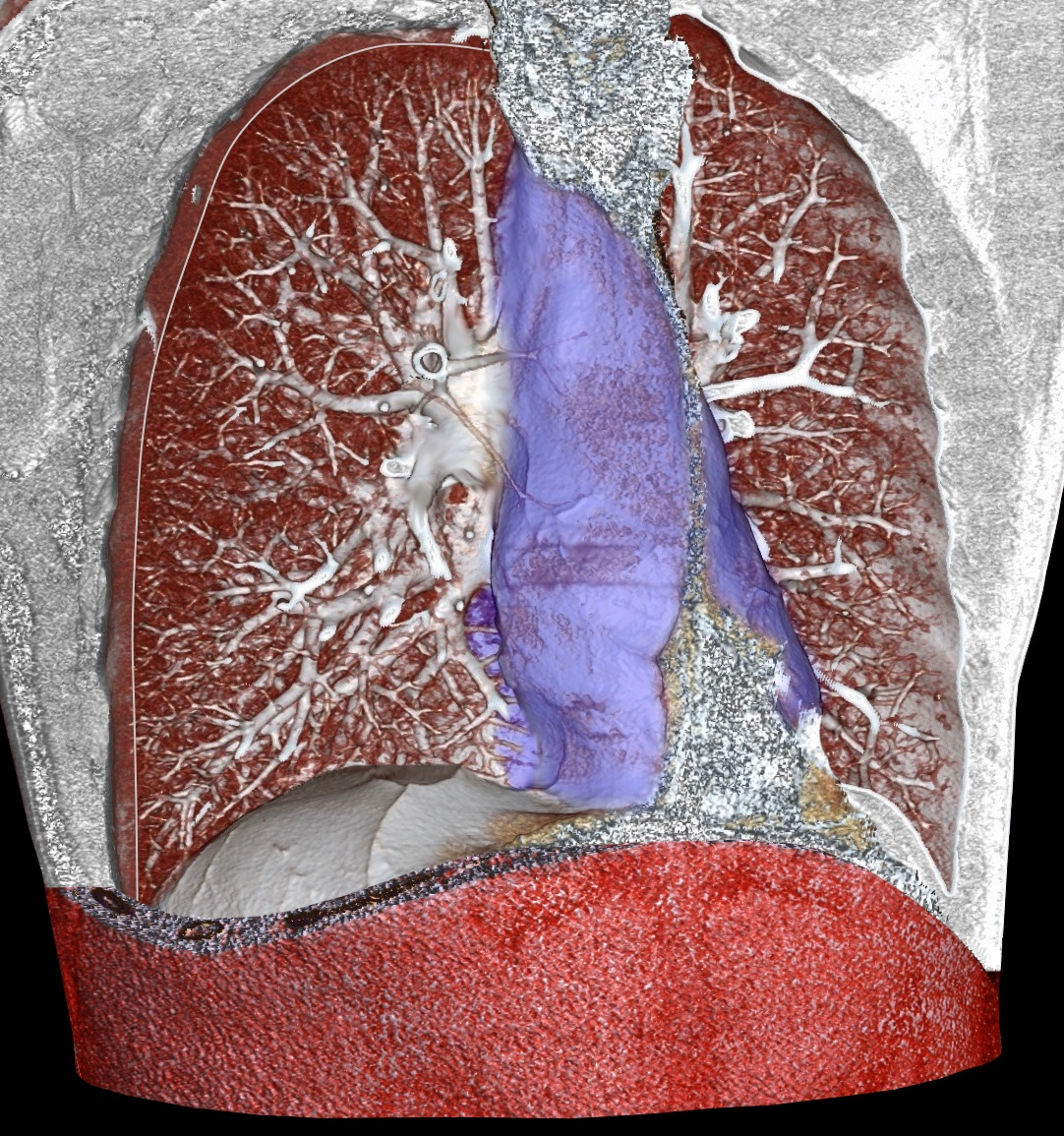
- Mediastinum
- Specialty: Pulmonology

Mediastinitis is inflammation of the tissues in the mid-chest, or mediastinum. It can be either acute or chronic. It is thought to be due to four different etiologies:

- direct contamination
- hematogenous or lymphatic spread
- extension of infection from the neck or retroperitoneum
- extension from the lung or pleura

Acute mediastinitis is usually caused by bacteria and is most often due to perforation of the esophagus. As the infection can progress rapidly, this is considered a serious condition.

Chronic sclerosing (or fibrosing) mediastinitis, while potentially serious, is caused by a long-standing inflammation of the mediastinum, leading to growth of acellular collagen and fibrous tissue within the chest and around the central vessels and airways. It has a different cause, treatment, and prognosis than acute infectious mediastinitis.

Space infections: Pretracheal space – lies anterior to trachea. Pretracheal space infection leads to mediastinitis. Here, the fascia fuses with the pericardium and the parietal pleura, which explains the occurrence of empyema and pericardial effusion in mediastinitis. However, infectious of other spaces can also lead to mediastinitis.

== Symptoms ==
=== Acute ===
Acute mediastinitis is an infectious process and can cause fever, chills, and tachycardia. Pain can occur with mediastinitis but the location of the pain depends on which part of the mediastinum is involved. When the upper mediastinum is involved, the pain is typically retro-sternal pain. When the lower mediastinum is involved, pain can be located between in the scapulae and radiate around to the chest.

=== Chronic ===
Symptoms depend on what organs of the mediastinum the disease is affecting. They might be caused by a constricted airway, constricted esophagus, or constricted blood vessels. Symptoms also depend on how much fibrosis has occurred. There may be cough, shortness of breath, coughing up blood, pain in the chest, and difficulty in swallowing.

== Causes ==
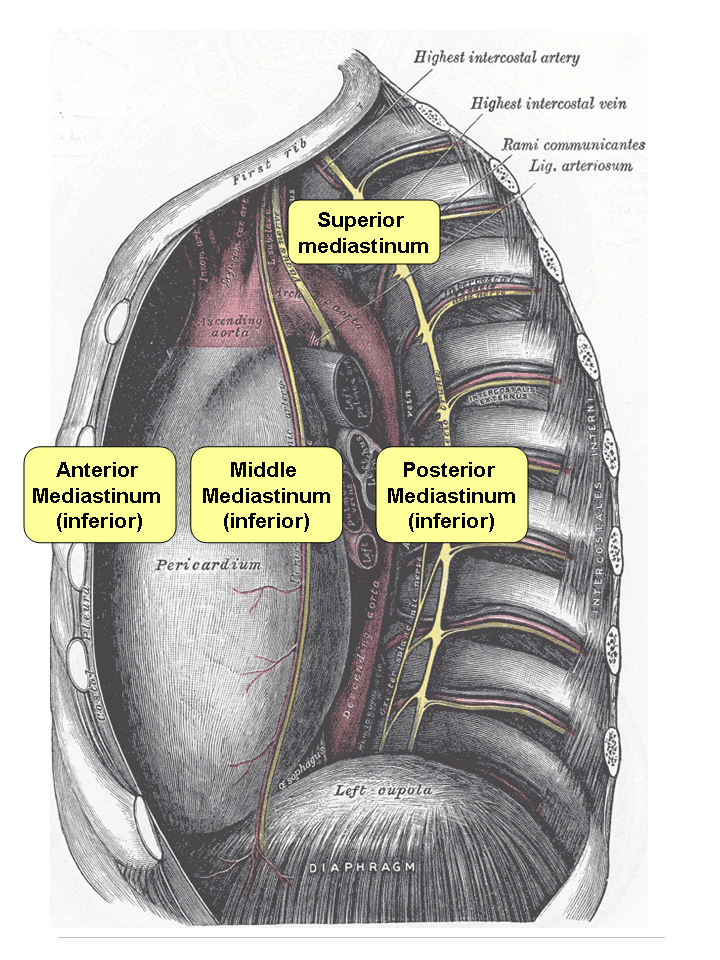
Mediastinum Anatomy

=== Acute ===
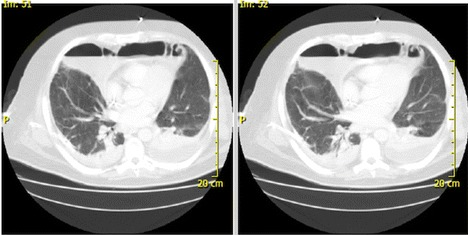
CT scan of a patient with Descending Necrotizing Mediastinitis.

Esophageal perforation, a form of direct contamination, accounts for 90% of acute mediastinal infections. Esophageal perforation can arise from vomiting, incidental trauma from a procedure or operation, external trauma, ingestion of corrosive substances, malignancy, or other esophageal disease.

Other causes of acute mediastinitis include infection secondary to cervical disease which arises from dental procedures, skin infections of the neck, neck trauma, or neck procedures.

Descending necrotizing mediastinitis (DNM) was first described by Herman E. Pearse Jr., M.D. in 1938 and he stated, "the term 'mediastinitis' means little unless qualified by a description of its type and kind." Although Descending Necrotizing Mediastinitis is an acute mediastinitis, it is distinct because it does not originate from structures within the mediastinum. Therefore, the term Descending Necrotizing Mediastinitis implies that the infection of the mediastinum originated from a primary site in the head or neck and descended through fascial spaces into the mediastinum.

Though rare in developed countries, acute mediastinitis can be caused by inhalation of bacterial spores such as Anthrax. Historically, this infection was referred to as Wool-sorter's Disease. In the lungs, spores can spread via lymphatics to mediastinal lymph nodes, where the mature rods can release exotoxins promoting edema and tissue necrosis. Clinically, persons infected with anthrax can develop a hemorrhagic mediastinitis, which manifests as acute pulmonary hemorrhage and meningitis. Hallmark finding of disease is a widened mediastinum visualized on chest x-ray. Once clinical symptoms of anthrax induced mediastinitis appear, disease is nearly 100% fatal. Individuals with known exposure to spores may be treated prophylactically with antibiotics (fluoroquinolones or tetracycline) to prevent disease progression.

=== Chronic ===
There are two types of fibrosing mediastinitis: granulomatous and non-granulomatous. Granulomatous mediastinitis is due to a granulomatous process of the mediastinal lymph nodes leading to fibrosis and chronic abscesses in the mediastinum. The most common causes are histoplasmosis and tuberculosis infections. Non-granulomatous fibrosing mediastinitis is caused by an idiopathic reaction to drugs and radiation therapy. Autoimmune disease and Behcet's disease are also causes.

=== Etiology ===
An observational retrospective study of 17 patients diagnosed with DNM found that the infections most often originated from neck infections including tonsillar abscess, pharyngitis, and epiglottitis. The study also found that most infections are poly-microbial. Often the culprits are usually Gram-positive bacteria and anaerobes, though rarely, Gram-negative bacteria are also present. This severe form represents 20% of acute mediastinitis cases.

== Diagnosis ==
=== Acute ===
Acute mediastinitis can be confirmed by contrast x-rays since most cases of acute mediastinitis are due to esophageal perforation. Other studies that can be used include endoscopic visualization, Chest CT scan with oral and intravenous contrast.

With regards to CT Imaging, the extent of involvement of the mediastinum can be evaluated. Therefore, acute mediastinitis can be classified into three categories:

1. diffuse mediastinitis
2. isolated mediastinal abscess
3. mediastinitis or mediastinal abscess complicated by empyema or subphrenic abscess.

=== Chronic ===
Most cases of granulomatous mediastinitis (75%) are incidentally found on chest x-rays which show a mediastinal mass, or widening of the mediastinum.

== Treatment ==
Treatment for acute mediastinitis usually involves aggressive intravenous antibiotic therapy and hydration. If discrete fluid collections or grossly infected tissue have formed (such as abscesses), they may have to be surgically drained or debrided.

Treatment for DNM usually requires an operation to remove and drain infected necrotic tissue. Broad spectrum intravenous antibiotics are also given to treat the infection. Patients are typically managed in the intensive care unit due to the severity of the disease.

Treatment for chronic fibrosing mediastinitis is somewhat controversial, and may include steroids or surgical decompression of affected vessels.

== Prognosis ==
Fibrosing mediastinitis can lead to entrapment of mediastinal structures. The mortality of DNM ranges from 10 to 40% due to sepsis and multi-organ failure if not recognized and intervened upon early.
