= Cardiac plexus =

Bunch of vagus nerve branches that support the heart's functions

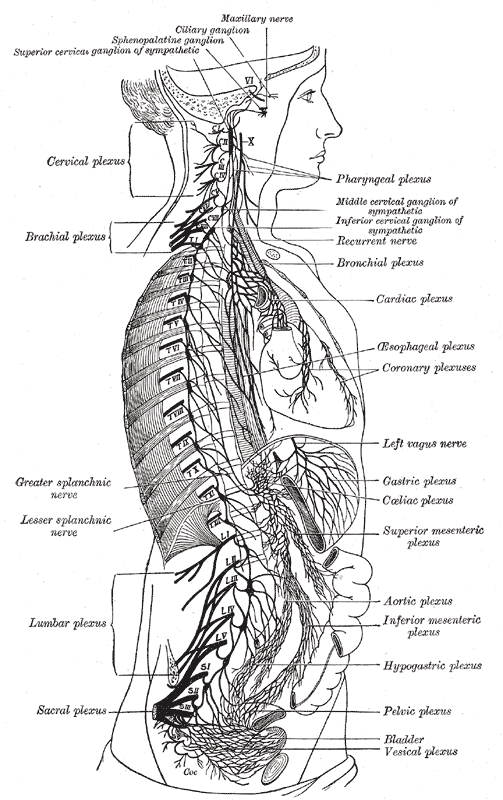
- The right sympathetic chain and its connections with the thoracic, abdominal, and pelvic plexuses. (Cardiac plexus labeled at center right.)

Details

Identifiers
- Latin: plexus cardiacus
- TA98: A14.3.03.013
- TA2: 6688
- FMA: 6628

The cardiac plexus is a plexus of nerves situated at the base of the heart that innervates the heart.

== Structure ==
The cardiac plexus is divided into a superficial part, which lies in the concavity of the aortic arch, and a deep part, between the aortic arch and the trachea. The two parts are, however, closely connected. The sympathetic component of the cardiac plexus comes from cardiac nerves, which originate from the sympathetic trunk. The parasympathetic component of the cardiac plexus originates from the cardiac branches of the vagus nerve.

=== Superficial part ===
The superficial part of the cardiac plexus lies beneath the aortic arch, in front of the right pulmonary artery. It is formed by the superior cervical cardiac branch of the left sympathetic trunk and the inferior cardiac branch of the left vagus nerve. A small ganglion, the cardiac ganglion of Wrisberg, is occasionally found connected with these nerves at their point of junction. This ganglion, when present, is situated immediately beneath the arch of the aorta, on the right side of the ligamentum arteriosum.

The superficial part of the cardiac plexus gives branches to:

- the deep part of the plexus.
- the anterior coronary plexus.
- the left anterior pulmonary plexus.

=== Deep part ===
The deep part of the cardiac plexus is situated in front of the bifurcation of the trachea (known as the carina), above the point of division of the pulmonary artery, and behind the aortic arch. It is formed by the cardiac nerves derived from the cervical ganglia of the sympathetic trunk, and the cardiac branches of the vagus and recurrent laryngeal nerves.

The only cardiac nerves which do not enter into the formation of the deep part of the cardiac plexus are the superior cardiac nerve of the left sympathetic trunk, and the lower of the two superior cervical cardiac branches from the left vagus nerve, which pass to the superficial part of the plexus.

=== Right half ===
The branches from the right half of the deep part of the cardiac plexus pass, some in front of, and others behind, the right pulmonary artery; the former, the more numerous, transmit a few filaments to the anterior pulmonary plexus, and are then continued onward to form part of the anterior coronary plexus; those behind the pulmonary artery distribute a few filaments to the right atrium, and are then continued onward to form part of the posterior coronary plexus.

=== Left half ===
The left half of the deep part of the plexus is connected with the superficial part of the cardiac plexus, and gives filaments to the left atrium, and to the anterior pulmonary plexus, and is then continued to form the greater part of the posterior coronary plexus.

== See also ==
- Sympathetic trunk
- Splanchnic nerves
- Autonomic nervous system
