= Cerebellar artery =

Neural artery

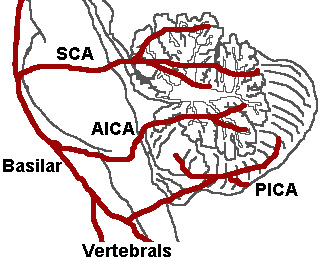
- The three major arteries of the cerebellum: the SCA, AICA, and PICA.

Details
- Vein: Cerebellar veins

The cerebellar arteries are three pairs of arteries in the posterior cerebral circulation, that provide blood to the cerebellum. They are the superior cerebellar artery (SCA), the anterior inferior cerebellar artery (AICA), and the posterior inferior cerebellar artery (PICA).
