= Stellate ganglion =

Component of the human nervous system

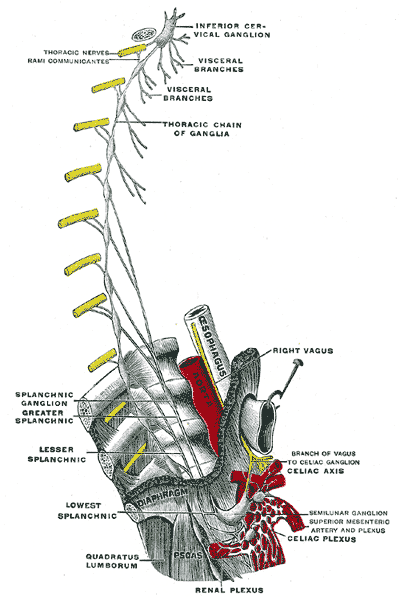
- Plan of right sympathetic cord and splanchnic nerves. (Stellate ganglion not visible, but region is shown.)

Details
- From: Inferior cervical ganglion, first thoracic ganglia

Identifiers
- Latin: ganglion cervicothoracicum, ganglion stellatum
- MeSH: D013233
- TA98: A14.3.01.020
- TA2: 6612
- FMA: 6469

The stellate ganglion (or cervicothoracic ganglion) is a sympathetic ganglion formed by the fusion of the inferior cervical ganglion and the first thoracic (superior thoracic sympathetic) ganglion, which is present in 80% of individuals. Sometimes, the second and the third thoracic ganglia are included in this fusion.

== Anatomy ==
The stellate ganglion is polygonal in shape (Latin: stellatum, lit. 'star-shaped'). It is relatively big (10–12 × 8–20 mm) compared to the much smaller thoracic, lumbar, and sacral ganglia.

=== Relations ===
The stellate ganglion is located at the level of C7, anterior to the transverse process of C7 and the neck of the first rib, superior to the cervical pleura and just below the subclavian artery. It is superiorly covered by the prevertebral lamina of the cervical fascia and is anteriorly related to the common carotid artery, subclavian artery and the origin of the vertebral artery, which sometimes leaves a groove at the apex of this ganglion. This groove can sometimes even separate the stellate ganglion into a so-called vertebral ganglion.

The relations of the apex of the stellate ganglion are as follows:

- covered by the endothoracic fascia and parietal pleura
- right stellate ganglion is in relation with right brachiocephalic vein anteriorly
- right stellate ganglion is in relation with sternal part of subclavian artery anteriorly
- laterally: first intercostal artery
- medially: longus colli muscle

== Clinical significance ==
The stellate ganglia may be cut in order to decrease the symptoms exhibited by Raynaud's phenomenon and hyperhydrosis (extreme sweating) of the hands. Injection of local anesthetics near the stellate ganglion can sometimes mitigate the symptoms of sympathetically mediated pain such as complex regional pain syndrome type I (reflex sympathetic dystrophy), and symptoms associated with alterations in arousal and reactivity (Criterion E) of PTSD. Injection is often given near the Chassaignac's tubercle (anterior tubercle of transverse process of C6) due to this being an important landmark lateral to the cricoid cartilage. It is thought that anesthetic is spread along the paravertebral muscles to the stellate ganglion.

Stellate ganglion block also shows potential as a means of reducing the number of hot flashes and night awakenings suffered by breast cancer survivors and women experiencing severe symptoms of menopause.

There has been interest in using stellate ganglion blocks to treat PTSD, particularly in combat veterans. A 2017 review of the evidence from the VA Evidence-based Synthesis Program found that while the procedure had been reported as effective in unblinded case series, the evidence from randomized controlled trials remained inconclusive.

Nerve fibers from the stellate ganglion go up the superior cervical sympathetic chain and into the pterygopalatine (sphenopalatine) ganglion (SPG). SPG blocks have been shown to reduce anxiety, headaches, migraines, cancer pain and other disorders. Self-administration of SPG blocks (SASPGB) is another method of delivering sphenopalatine blockade and indirect stellate ganglion blockade.

Complications associated with a stellate ganglion block include Horner's syndrome, accidental intra-arterial or intravenous injection, difficulty swallowing, vocal cord paralysis, epidural spread of local anaesthetic, and pneumothorax.

Block of the stellate ganglion has also been explored in coronary artery bypass surgery, as well as posttraumatic stress disorder.

There are current investigations into stellate ganglion block for those suffering from altered sense of smell and taste due to COVID-19 infection.

Left stellectomy is a treatment strategy in prolonged QT syndrome because activity of the stellate ganglia drives prolonged QT. However, this therapy is only offered to patients who are already on a beta blocker and experience frequent shocks from an implantable cardioverter-defibrillator (ICD), because stellectomy causes Horner's syndrome.

Stellate ganglion nerve block can also be used as a treatment for refractory ventricular tachycardia.

== Anatomy ==
The stellate ganglion lies in front of the neck of the first rib, and posterior to the common carotid artery. The vertebral artery lies anterior to the ganglion as it has just originated from the subclavian artery. After passing over the ganglion, the artery enters the vertebral foramen and lies posterior to the anterior tubercle of C6 (Chassaignac's tubercle).
