= Carina of trachea =

Ridge of cartilage separating the openings of the main bronchi

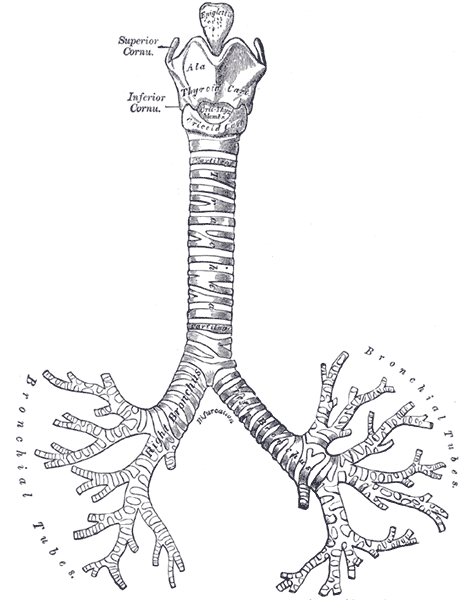
- Cartilages of larynx, trachea and bronchi. (Carina is at the point of bifurcation.)

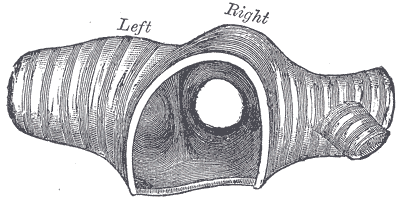
- Transverse section of the trachea, just above its bifurcation, with a bird’s-eye view of the interior. (Carina not labeled; the ridge that separates the left and right bronchus.)

Details
- System: Respiratory system

Identifiers
- Latin: carina tracheae
- TA98: A06.3.01.009
- TA2: 3225
- FMA: 7465

The carina of trachea (also: "tracheal carina") is a ridge of cartilage at the base of the trachea separating the openings of the left and right main bronchi.

== Structure ==
The carina is a cartilaginous ridge separating the left and right main bronchi that is formed by the inferior-ward and posterior-ward prolongation of the inferior-most tracheal cartilage.

The carina occurs at the lower end of the trachea - usually at the level of the transverse thoracic plane (also plane of Louis), which passes through the intervertebral disc between thoracic vertebrae 4 and 5 posteriorly, and the second costal cartilage anteriorly. This is in line with the sternal angle, but the carina may raise or descend up to two vertebrae higher or lower with breathing. The carina lies to the left of the midline, and runs antero-posteriorly (front to back).

=== Blood supply ===
The bronchial arteries supply the carina and the rest of the lower trachea.

=== Relations ===
The carina is around the area posterior to where the aortic arch crosses to the left of the trachea. The azygos vein crosses right to the trachea above the carina.

== Physiology ==
The mucous membrane of the carina is the most sensitive area of the trachea and larynx for triggering a cough reflex.

== Clinical significance ==
Tracheobronchial injury, an injury to the airways, occurs within 2.5 cm of the carina 60% of the time.

=== Diagnostic radiology ===
Widening and distortion of the carina is a serious radiological sign that usually indicates carcinoma of the lymph nodes around the region where the trachea divides.

== Additional images ==
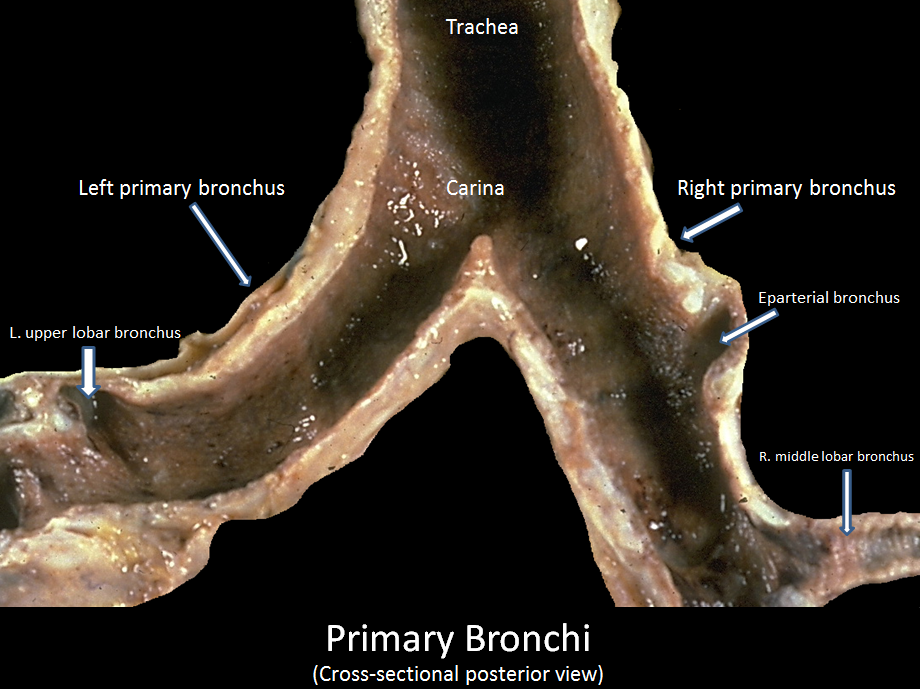
Anatomical dissection of trachea and main bronchi showing the carina

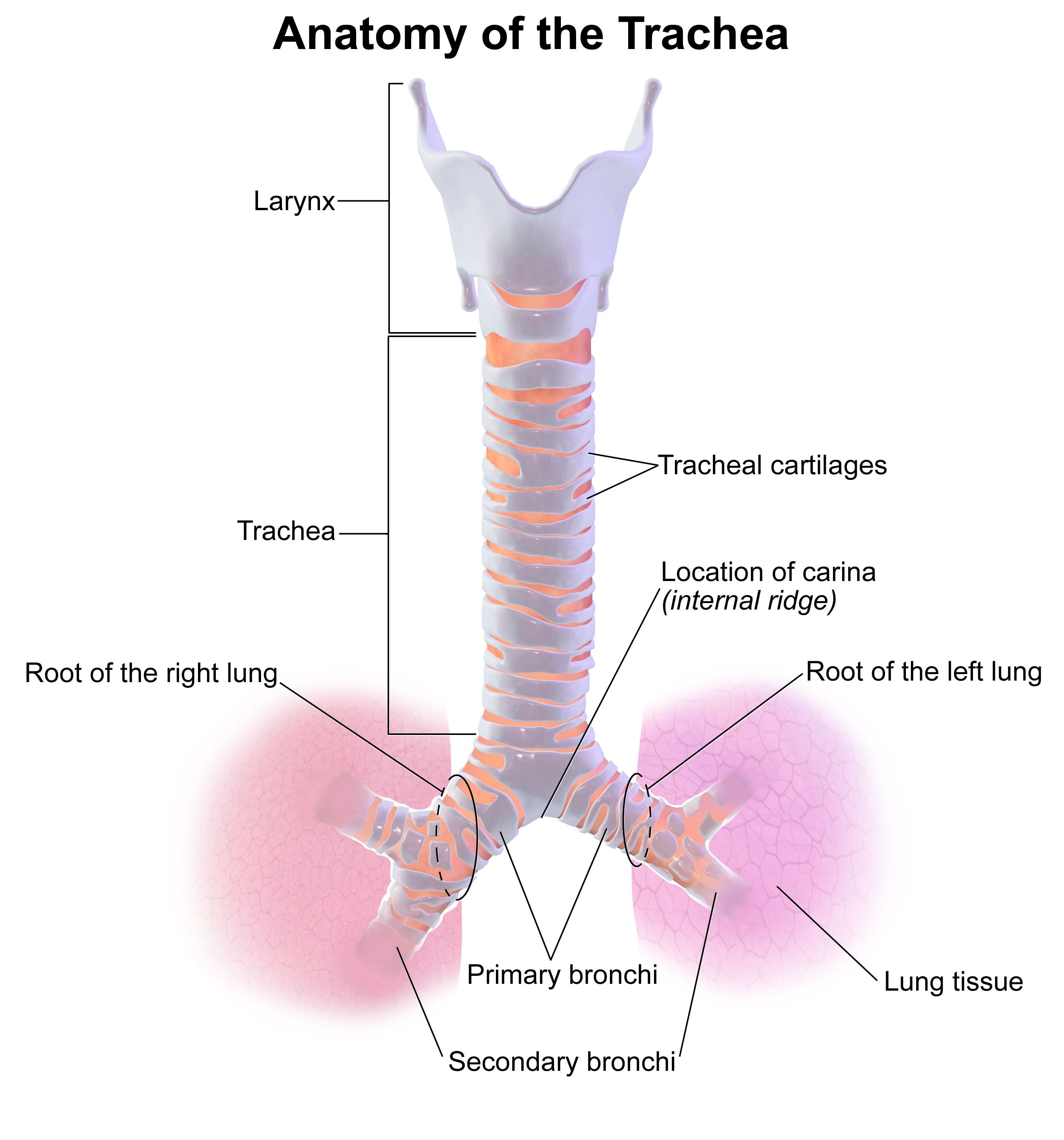
Anatomy of the trachea
