= Vagus nerve =

Main nerve of the parasympathetic nervous system

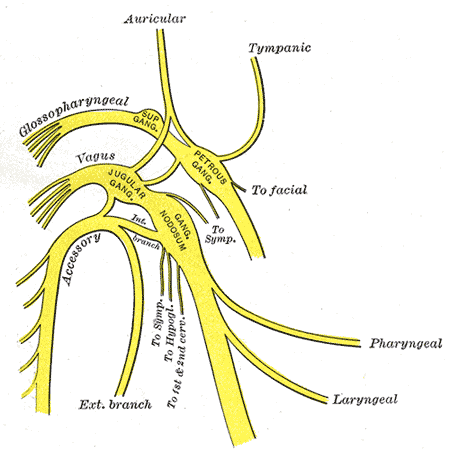
- Plan of the upper portions of the glossopharyngeal, vagus, and accessory nerves

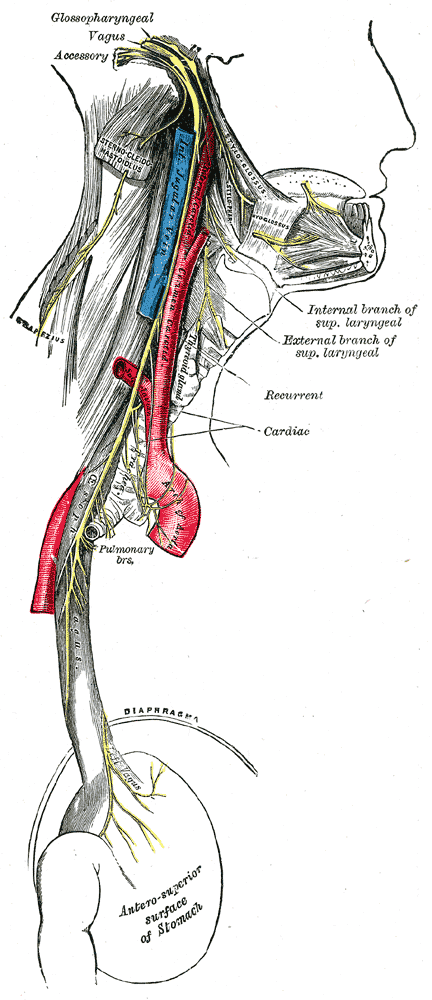
- Course and distribution of the glossopharyngeal, vagus, and accessory nerves

Details
- Innervates: Levator veli palatini, salpingopharyngeus, palatoglossus, palatopharyngeus, superior pharyngeal constrictor, middle pharyngeal constrictor, inferior pharyngeal constrictor, viscera

Identifiers
- Latin: nervus vagus
- MeSH: D014630
- NeuroNames: 702
- TA98: A14.2.01.153
- TA2: 6332
- FMA: 5731

The vagus nerve, also known as the tenth cranial nerve (CN X), plays a crucial role in the autonomic nervous system, which is responsible for regulating involuntary functions within the human body. This nerve carries both sensory and motor fibers and serves as a major pathway that connects the brain to various organs, including the heart, lungs, and digestive tract. As a key part of the parasympathetic nervous system, the vagus nerve helps regulate essential involuntary functions like heart rate, breathing, and digestion. By controlling these processes, the vagus nerve contributes to the body's "rest and digest" response, helping to calm the body after stress, lower heart rate, improve digestion, and maintain homeostasis.

There are two separate vagus nerves: the right vagus and the left vagus. In the neck, the right vagus nerve contains on average approximately 105,000 fibers, while the left vagus nerve has about 87,000 fibers, according to one source. Other sources report different figures, with around 25,000 fibers in the right vagus nerve and 23,000 fibers in the left.

The vagus nerve is the longest nerve of the autonomic nervous system in the human body, consisting of both sensory – the majority – and some motor fibers, both sympathetic and parasympathetic. The sensory fibers originate from the jugular and nodose ganglia, while the motor fibers are derived from neurons in the dorsal nucleus of the vagus and the nucleus ambiguus. Although historically the vagus nerve was also known as the pneumogastric nerve, reflecting its role in regulating both the lungs and digestive system, its role in regulating cardiac function is fundamental.

== Structure ==
Upon leaving the medulla oblongata between the olive and the inferior cerebellar peduncle, the vagus nerve extends through the jugular foramen, then passes into the carotid sheath between the internal carotid artery and the internal jugular vein down to the neck, chest, and abdomen, where it contributes to the innervation of the viscera, reaching all the way to the colon. Besides giving some output to various organs, the vagus nerve comprises between 80% and 90% of afferent nerve fibers conveying sensory information about the state of the body's organs to the central nervous system.

The right and left vagus nerves descend from the cranial vault through the jugular foramina, penetrating the carotid sheath between the internal and external carotid arteries, then passing posterolateral to the common carotid artery. The cell bodies of visceral afferent fibers of the vagus nerve are located bilaterally in the inferior ganglion of the vagus nerve (nodose ganglia). The vagus runs parallel to the common carotid artery and internal jugular vein inside the carotid sheath.

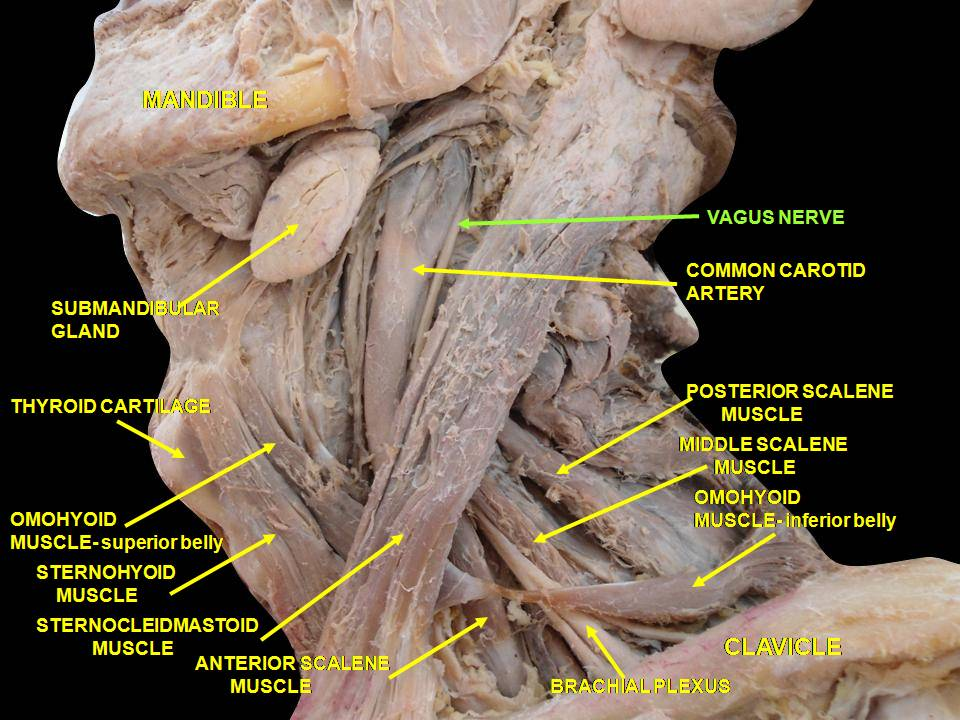
Vagus nerve

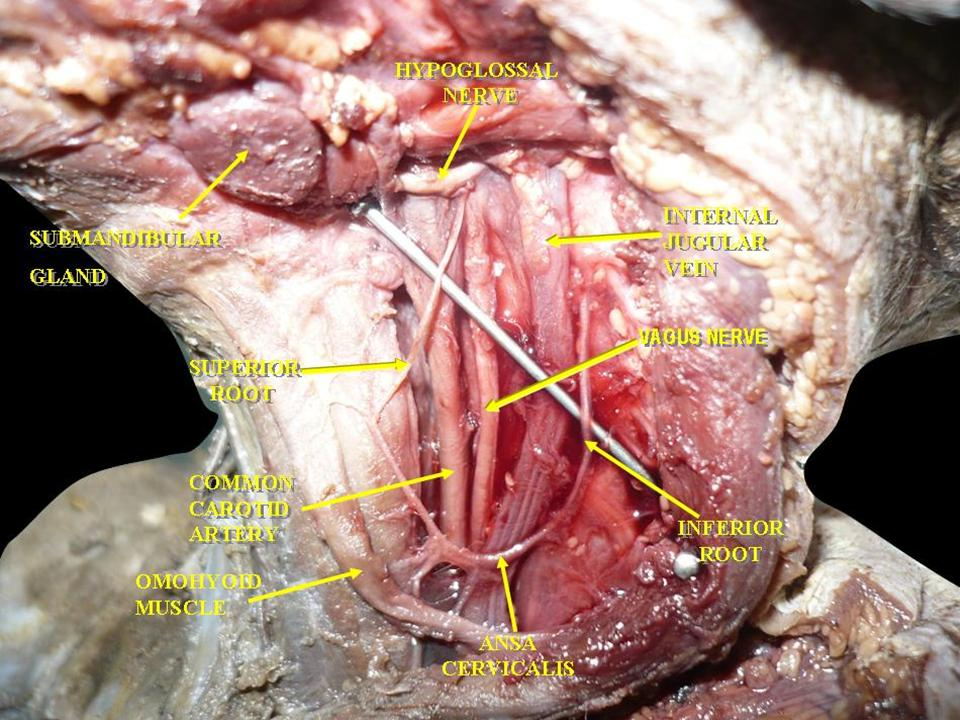
Vagus nerve

Right Vagus Nerve: The right vagus nerve gives rise to the right recurrent laryngeal nerve, which hooks around the right subclavian artery and ascends into the neck between the trachea and esophagus. The right vagus then crosses anterior to the right subclavian artery, runs posterior to the superior vena cava, descends posterior to the right main bronchus, and contributes to cardiac, pulmonary, and esophageal plexuses. It forms the posterior vagal trunk at the lower part of the esophagus and passes through the diaphragm to enter the abdomen through the esophageal hiatus.

Left Vagus Nerve: The left vagus nerve enters the thorax between left common carotid artery and left subclavian artery and descends on the aortic arch. It gives rise to the left recurrent laryngeal nerve, which hooks around the aortic arch to the left of the ligamentum arteriosum and ascends between the trachea and esophagus. The left vagus further gives off thoracic cardiac branches, breaks up into the pulmonary plexus, continues into the esophageal plexus, and enters the abdomen as the anterior vagal trunk by way of the esophageal hiatus of the diaphragm.

=== Branches ===
- Pharyngeal nerve
- Superior laryngeal nerve
- Aortic nerve
- Superior cervical cardiac branches of vagus nerve
- Inferior cervical cardiac branch
- Recurrent laryngeal nerve
- Thoracic cardiac branches
- Branches to the pulmonary plexus
- Branches to the esophageal plexus
- Anterior vagal trunk
- Posterior vagal trunk

=== Nuclei ===
The vagus nerve includes axons which emerge from or converge onto four nuclei of the medulla:

1. The dorsal nucleus of vagus nerve – sends parasympathetic output to the viscera, especially the intestines
2. The nucleus ambiguus – gives rise to the branchial efferent motor fibers of the vagus nerve and preganglionic parasympathetic neurons that innervate the heart
3. The solitary nucleus – receives afferent taste information and primary afferents from visceral organs
4. The spinal trigeminal nucleus – receives information about deep/crude touch, pain, and temperature of the outer ear, the dura of the posterior cranial fossa and the mucosa of the larynx

== Development ==
The motor division of the glossopharyngeal nerve is derived from the basal plate of the embryonic medulla oblongata, while the sensory division originates from the cranial neural crest. The development of the vagus nerve begins early in embryonic life, around the third to fourth week of gestation. It forms from two key structures: neural crest cells, which contribute to its sensory components, and the neural tube, which forms its motor components in the brainstem (specifically in the medulla oblongata). By weeks 4 to 5, the vagus nerve begins to connect with the fourth and sixth pharyngeal arches, which give rise to muscles involved in swallowing and speaking. Around weeks 5 to 6, specialized nuclei in the brainstem develop to manage the nerve’s motor and sensory functions. These centers are essential for regulating vital automatic processes like breathing, digestion, and heart rate. Between weeks 6 and 9, the vagus nerve extends its branches to various organs, including the heart, lungs, and gastrointestinal tract, as well as sensory areas like the ear and throat. As the fetus grows, the vagus nerve matures into a crucial part of the parasympathetic nervous system, helping maintain the body's internal balance. This process shows how a single nerve can become so important for multiple systems in the body.

== Function ==
The vagus nerve supplies motor parasympathetic fibers to all the organs (except the adrenal glands) from the neck down to the second segment of the transverse colon. The vagus also controls a few skeletal muscles, including:

- Cricothyroid muscle
- Levator veli palatini muscle
- Salpingopharyngeus muscle
- Palatoglossus muscle
- Palatopharyngeus muscle
- Superior, middle and inferior pharyngeal constrictors
- Muscles of the larynx (speech).

This means that the vagus nerve is responsible for such varied tasks as heart rate, gastrointestinal peristalsis, sweating, and quite a few muscle movements in the mouth, including speech (via the recurrent laryngeal nerve). It also has some afferent fibers that innervate the inner (canal) portion of the outer ear (via the auricular branch, also known as Arnold's or Alderman's nerve) and part of the meninges. The vagus nerve is also responsible for regulating inflammation in the body, via the inflammatory reflex.

Efferent vagus nerve fibers innervating the pharynx and back of the throat are responsible for the gag reflex. In addition, 5-HT_{3} receptor-mediated afferent vagus stimulation in the gut due to gastroenteritis is a cause of vomiting. Stimulation of the vagus nerve in the cervix uteri (as in some medical procedures) can lead to a vasovagal response.

The vagus nerve also plays a role in satiation following food consumption. Knocking out vagal nerve receptors has been shown to cause hyperphagia (greatly increased food intake).

=== Cardiac effects ===
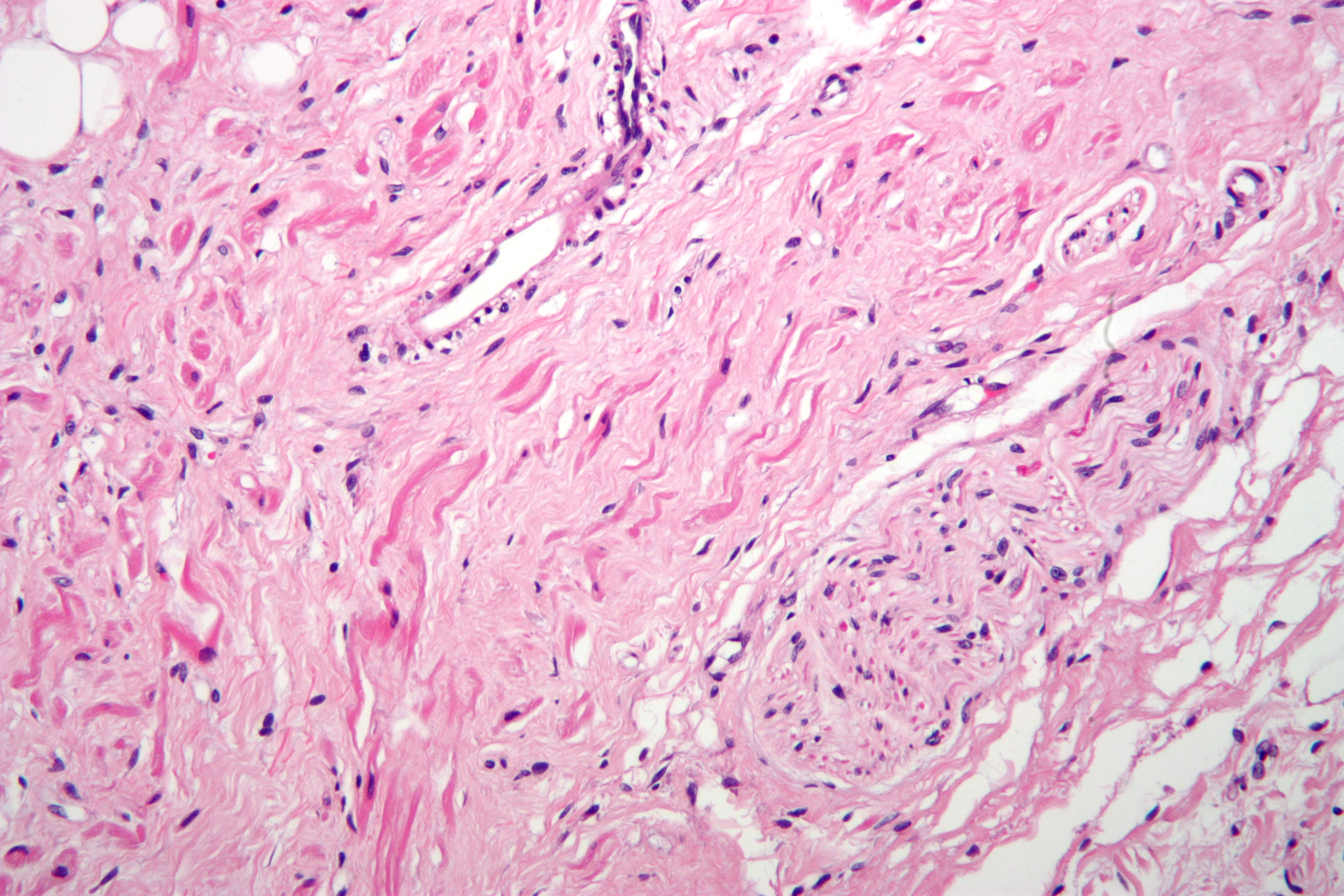
H&E stained fibers of the vagus nerve (bottom right) innervate the sinoatrial node tissue (middle left).

Parasympathetic innervation of the heart is partially controlled by the vagus nerve and is shared by the thoracic ganglia. Vagal and spinal ganglionic nerves mediate the lowering of the heart rate. The right vagus branch innervates the sinoatrial node. In healthy people, parasympathetic tone from these sources is well-matched to sympathetic tone. Hyperstimulation of parasympathetic influence promotes bradyarrhythmias. When hyperstimulated, the left vagal branch predisposes the heart to conduction block at the atrioventricular node.

At this location, neuroscientist Otto Loewi first demonstrated that nerves secrete substances called neurotransmitters, which have effects on receptors in target tissues. In his experiment, Loewi electrically stimulated the vagus nerve of a frog's heart, which slowed the heart. Then he took the fluid from the heart and transferred it to a second frog heart without a vagus nerve. The second heart slowed without electrical stimulation. Loewi described the substance released by the vagus nerve as vagusstoff, which was later found to be acetylcholine.

Drugs that inhibit the muscarinic receptors (anticholinergics) such as atropine and scopolamine, are called vagolytic because they inhibit the action of the vagus nerve on the heart, gastrointestinal tract, and other organs. Anticholinergic drugs increase heart rate and are used to treat bradycardia.

=== Urogenital and hormonal effects ===
Excessive activation of the vagal nerve during emotional stress, which is a parasympathetic overcompensation for a strong sympathetic nervous system response associated with stress, can also cause vasovagal syncope due to a sudden drop in cardiac output, causing cerebral hypoperfusion. Vasovagal syncope affects young children and women more than other groups. It can also lead to temporary loss of bladder control under moments of extreme fear.

Insulin signaling activates the adenosine triphosphate (ATP)-sensitive potassium (KATP) channels in the arcuate nucleus, decreases AgRP release, and through the vagus nerve, leads to decreased glucose production by the liver by decreasing gluconeogenic enzymes: phosphoenolpyruvate carboxykinase, glucose 6-phosphatase.

== Clinical significance ==
=== Stimulation ===
Vagus nerve stimulation (VNS) therapy via a neurostimulator implanted in the chest has been used to control seizures in epilepsy patients and has been approved for treating drug-resistant clinical depression. Several noninvasive VNS devices that stimulate an afferent branch of the vagus nerve are available. GammaCore is recommended by The National Institute for Health and Care Excellence (NICE) for cluster headaches.

Stimulation of the vagus nerve may be achieved by performing a vagal maneuver: carotid sinus massage, Valsalva maneuver, or the diving reflex. Vagal maneuvers may be used to abort episodes of supraventricular tachycardia.

Vagus nerve blocking (VBLOC) therapy is similar to VNS but used only during the day. In a six-month open-label trial involving three medical centers in Australia, Mexico, and Norway, vagus nerve blocking helped 31 obese participants lose an average of nearly 15 percent of their excess weight. As of 2008, a yearlong double-blind, phase II trial had begun.

=== Vagotomy ===
Vagotomy (cutting of the vagus nerve) is a now obsolete therapy that was performed for peptic ulcer disease and now superseded by oral medications, including H2 antagonists, proton pump inhibitors and antibiotics. Vagotomy is currently being researched as a less invasive alternative weight-loss procedure to gastric bypass surgery. The procedure curbs the feeling of hunger and is sometimes performed in conjunction with putting bands on patients' stomachs, resulting in an average of 43% of excess weight loss at six months with diet and exercise.

One serious side effect of vagotomy is a vitamin B_{12} deficiency later in life – perhaps after about 10 years – that is similar to pernicious anemia. The vagus normally stimulates the stomach's parietal cells to secrete acid and intrinsic factor. Intrinsic factor is needed to absorb vitamin B_{12} from food. The vagotomy reduces this secretion and ultimately leads to deficiency, which, if left untreated, causes nerve damage, tiredness, dementia, paranoia, and ultimately death.

Researchers from Aarhus University and Aarhus University Hospital have demonstrated that vagotomy prevents (halves the risk of) the development of Parkinson's disease, suggesting that Parkinson's disease begins in the gastrointestinal tract and spreads via the vagus nerve to the brain. Or giving further evidence to the theory that dysregulated environmental stimuli, such as that received by the vagus nerve from the gut, may have a negative effect on the dopamine reward system of the substantia nigra, thereby causing Parkinson's disease.

=== Vagus nerve pathology ===
The sympathetic and parasympathetic components of the autonomic nervous system (ANS) control and regulate the function of various organs, glands, and involuntary muscles throughout the body (e.g., vocalization, swallowing, heart rate, respiration, gastric secretion, and intestinal motility). Hence, most of the signs and symptoms of vagus nerve dysfunction, apart from vocalisation, are vague and non specific. Laryngeal nerve palsy results in paralysis of an ipsilateral vocal cord and is used as a pointer to diseases affecting the vagus nerve from its origin down to termination of its branch of the laryngeal nerve.

- Sensory neuropathy

The hypersensitivity of vagal afferent nerves causes refractory or idiopathic cough.

Arnold's nerve ear-cough reflex, though uncommon, is a manifestation of a vagal sensory neuropathy and this is the cause of a refractory chronic cough that can be treated with gabapentin. The cough is triggered by mechanical stimulation of the external auditory meatus and accompanied by other neuropathic features such as throat irritation (laryngeal paresthesia) and cough triggered by exposure to nontussive triggers such as cold air and eating (termed allotussia). These features suggest a neuropathic origin to the cough.

- Motor neuropathy

Pathology of the vagus nerve proximal to the laryngeal nerve typically presents with symptom hoarse voice and physical sign of paralysed vocal cords. Although a large proportion of these are the result of idiopathic vocal cord palsy but tumours especially lung cancers are next common cause. Tumours at the apex of right lung and at the hilum of the left lung are the most common oncological causes of vocal cord palsy. Less common tumours causing vocal cord palsy includes thyroid and proximal oesophageal malignancy.

== Etymology ==
The Latin word vagus means literally "wandering" (the words vagrant, vagabond, vague, and divagation come from the same root). Sometimes the right and left branches together are spoken of in the plural and are thus called vagi (/ˈveɪdʒaɪ/ VAY-jy). The vagus was also historically called the pneumogastric nerve since it innervates both the lungs and the stomach.

== Additional illustrations ==
Inferior view of the human brain, with the cranial nerves labeled

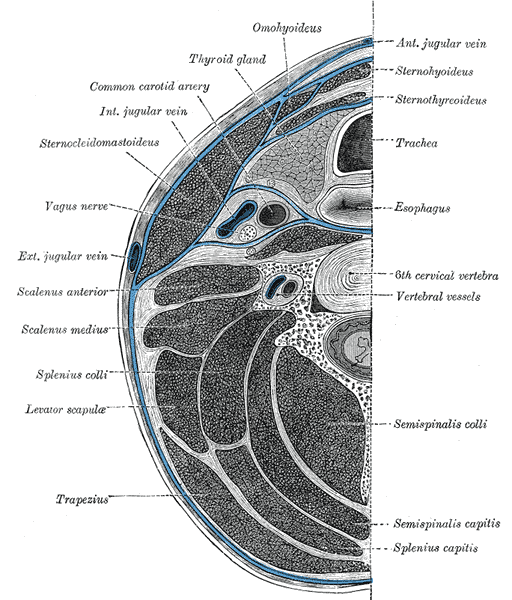
Section of the neck at about the level of the sixth cervical vertebra

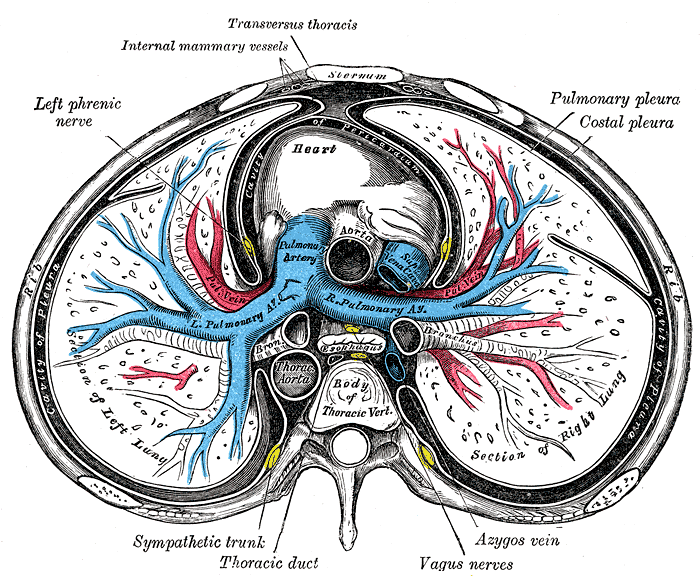
Transverse section of thorax, showing relations of pulmonary artery

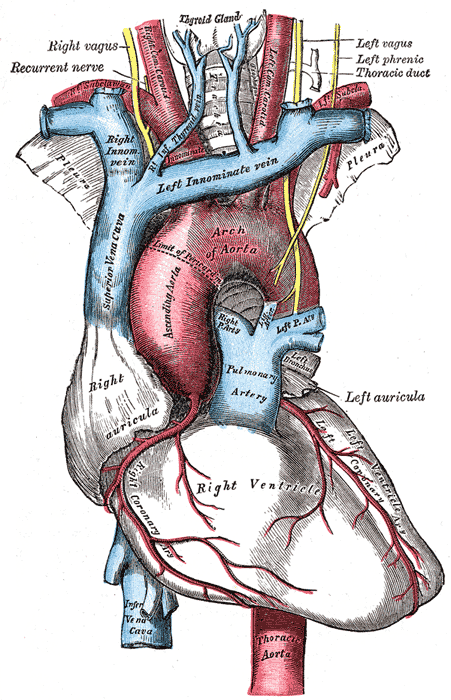
The arch of the aorta, and its branches

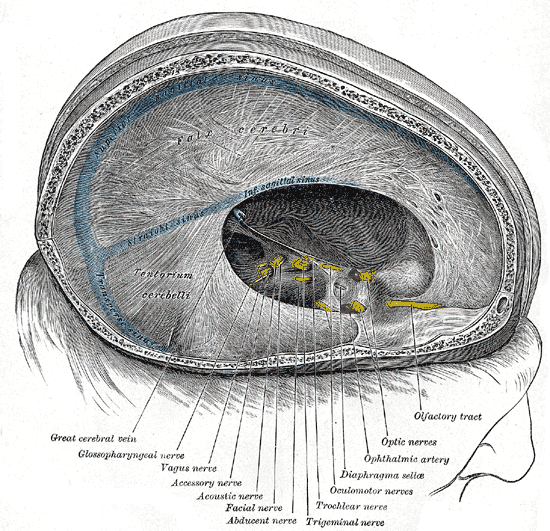
Dura mater and its processes exposed by removing part of the right half of the skull, and the brain

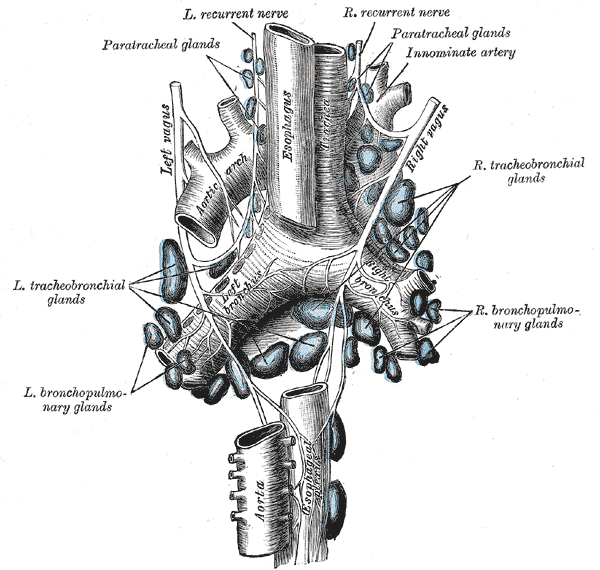
The tracheobronchial lymph glands

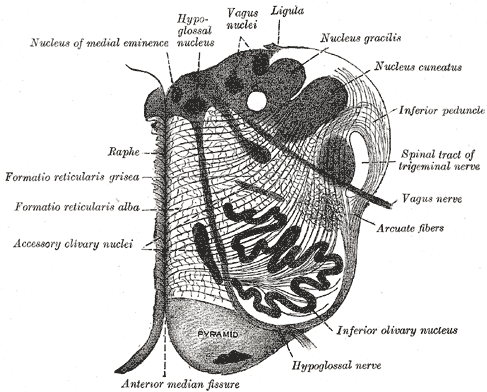
Section of the medulla oblongata at about the middle of the olive

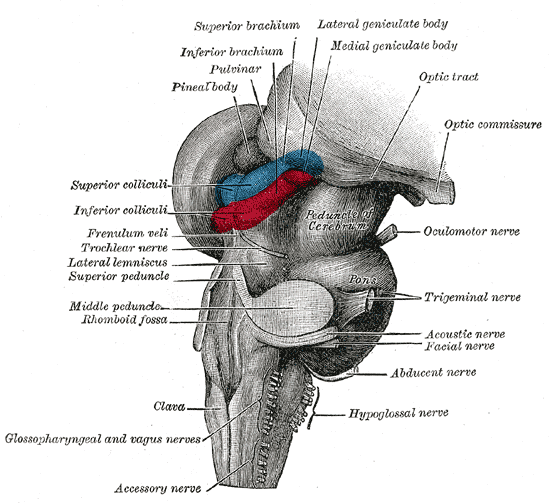
Hind- and mid-brains; postero-lateral view

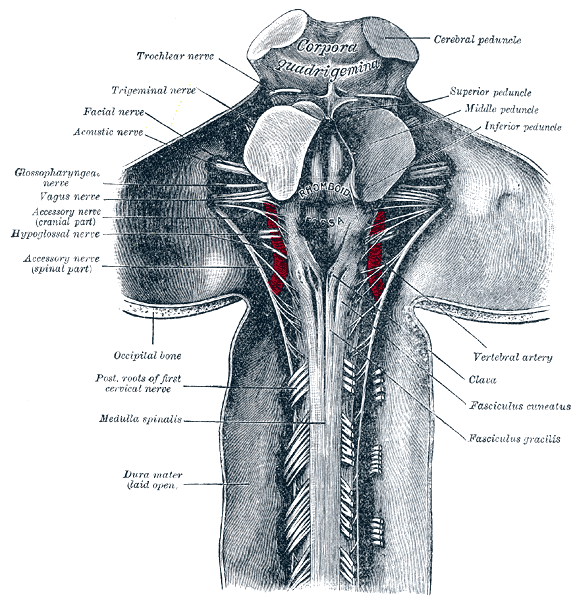
Upper part of medulla spinalis and hind- and mid-brains; posterior aspect, exposed in situ

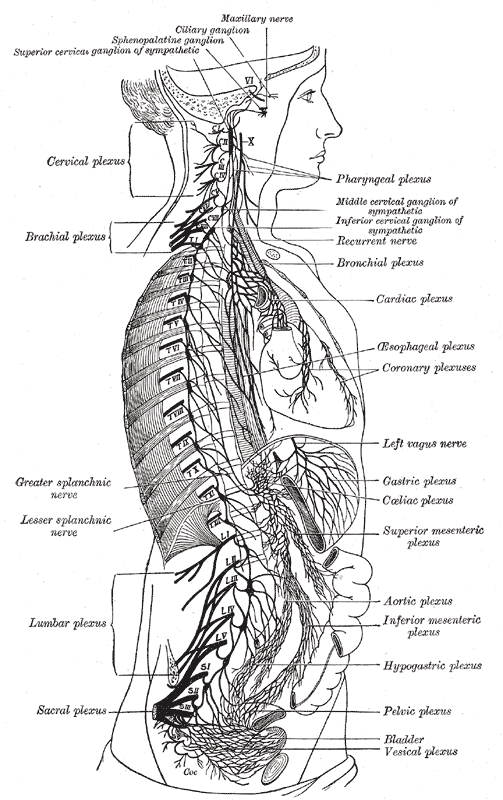
The right sympathetic chain and its connections with the thoracic, abdominal, and pelvic plexuses

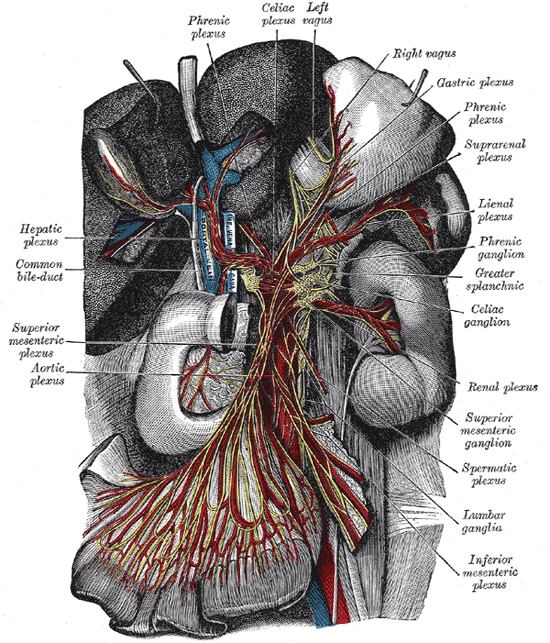
The celiac ganglia with the sympathetic plexuses of the abdominal viscera radiating from the ganglia

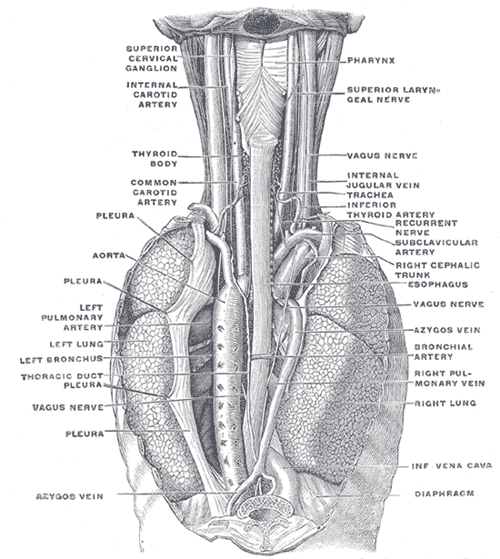
The position and relation of the esophagus in the cervical region and in the posterior mediastinum, seen from behind

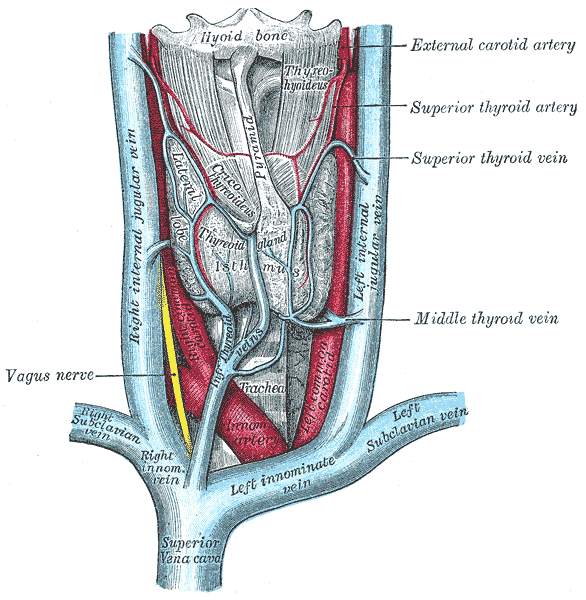
The thyroid gland and its relations

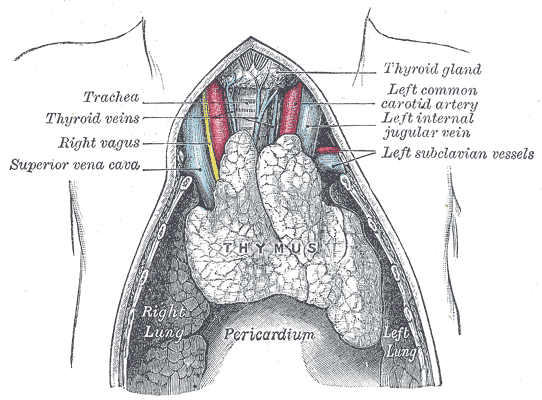
The thymus of a full-term fetus, exposed in situ

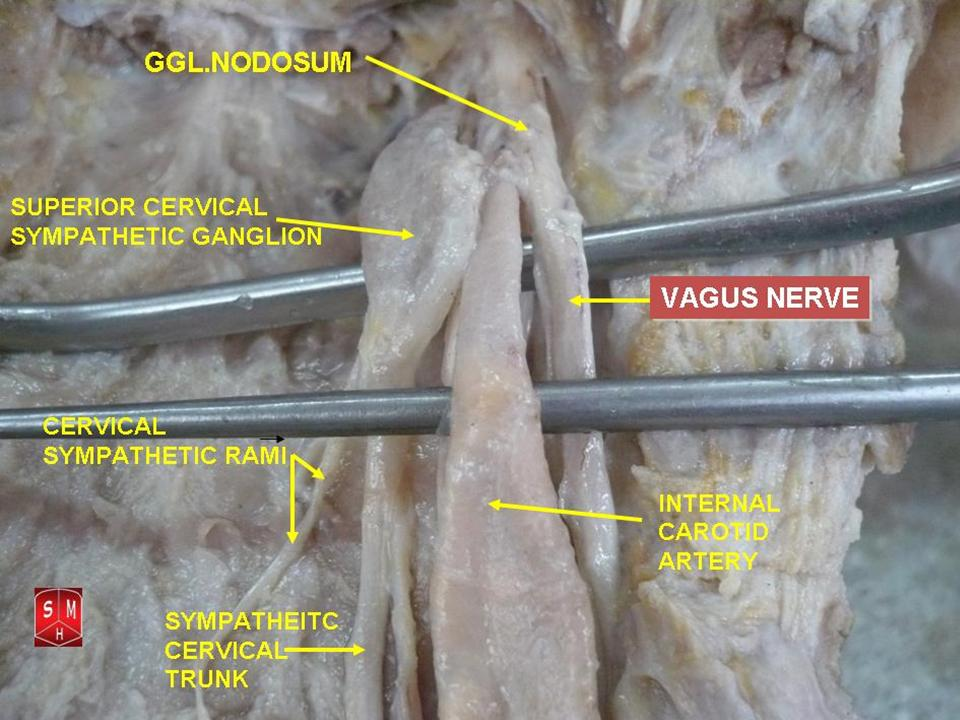
Vagus nerve – dissection

== See also ==
- Gastroparesis
- Inflammatory reflex
- Polyvagal theory
- Porphyria – A rare disorder can cause seizures and damage to the vagal nerve.
- Reflex syncope – Vasovagal syncope is one of the major types of reflex syncope.
- Vagal maneuver
- Vagovagal reflex
- Vagus ganglion
- Vagus nerve stimulation
- Vagusstoff
