= Middle cervical ganglion =

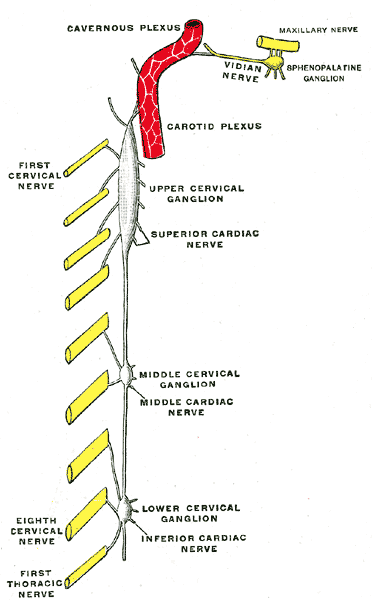
- Diagram of the cervical sympathetic. ("Middle cervical ganglion" labeled at center right.)

Details
- From: Middle cardiac nerve
- Innervates: Thyroid

Identifiers
- Latin: ganglion cervicale medium
- TA98: A14.3.01.016
- TA2: 6609
- FMA: 6468

The middle cervical ganglion is the smallest of the three cervical sympathetic ganglia (i.e. of the cervical portion of the sympathetic trunk). It presumably represents the merging of the sympathetic ganglia of cervical segments C5–C6. It is usually situated at the level of the sixth cervical vertebra.

== Anatomy ==
The middle cervical ganglion is presumed to represent the union of the two sympathetic ganglia corresponding to cervical segments C5–C6 since its gray rami communicantes usually join the cervical spinal nerves C5–C6, however, the ganglion sometimes also contributes gray rami communicantes to spinal nerves C4 and C7.

=== Relations ===
The ganglion is usually situated at the level of the sixth cervical vertebra, lying medial to its carotid tubercle. It is situated either anterior or superior to the inferior thyroid artery. It may adjoin the inferior cervical ganglion.

=== Branches ===
- Gray rami communicantes – join the anterior rami of the cervical nerves C5–C6, sometimes also C4 and C7.
- Thyroid branches – pass alongside the inferior thyroid artery to the thyroid gland.
- Middle cardiac nerve – descends through the neck to reach the cardiac plexus in the thorax.

=== Variation ===
It is sometimes absent, having either fused with the superior cervical ganglion or become replaced by small ganglia within the sympathetic trunk.

== See also ==
- Middle cardiac nerve
