= Pulmonary plexus =

Network of nerves in the thorax

Details

Identifiers
- Latin: plexus pulmonalis
- TA98: A14.2.01.172; A14.3.03.016
- TA2: 6691
- FMA: 6629

The pulmonary plexus is an autonomic plexus formed from pulmonary branches of vagus nerve and the sympathetic trunk. The plexus is in continuity with the deep cardiac plexus.

== Structure ==
It innervates the bronchial tree and the visceral pleura. According to the relation of nerves to the root of the lung, the pulmonary plexus is divided into the anterior pulmonary plexus, which lies in front of the lung and the posterior pulmonary plexus, which lies behind the lung. The anterior pulmonary plexus is close in proximity to the pulmonary artery. The posterior pulmonary plexus is bounded by the superior edge of the pulmonary artery and the lower edge of the pulmonary vein. Both lungs are innervated primarily by the posterior pulmonary plexus; it accounts for 74–77% of the total innervation.

== Function ==
Innervation of the bronchial tree regulates contraction of bronchial smooth muscles, mucous secretions from submucosal glands, vascular permeability, and blood flow. Sensory fiber innervation of the visceral pleura is thought to allow stretch detection.
