= List of nerves of the human body =

The following is a list of nerves in the human body:

== Location ==
Annotated diagram of the human nervous system

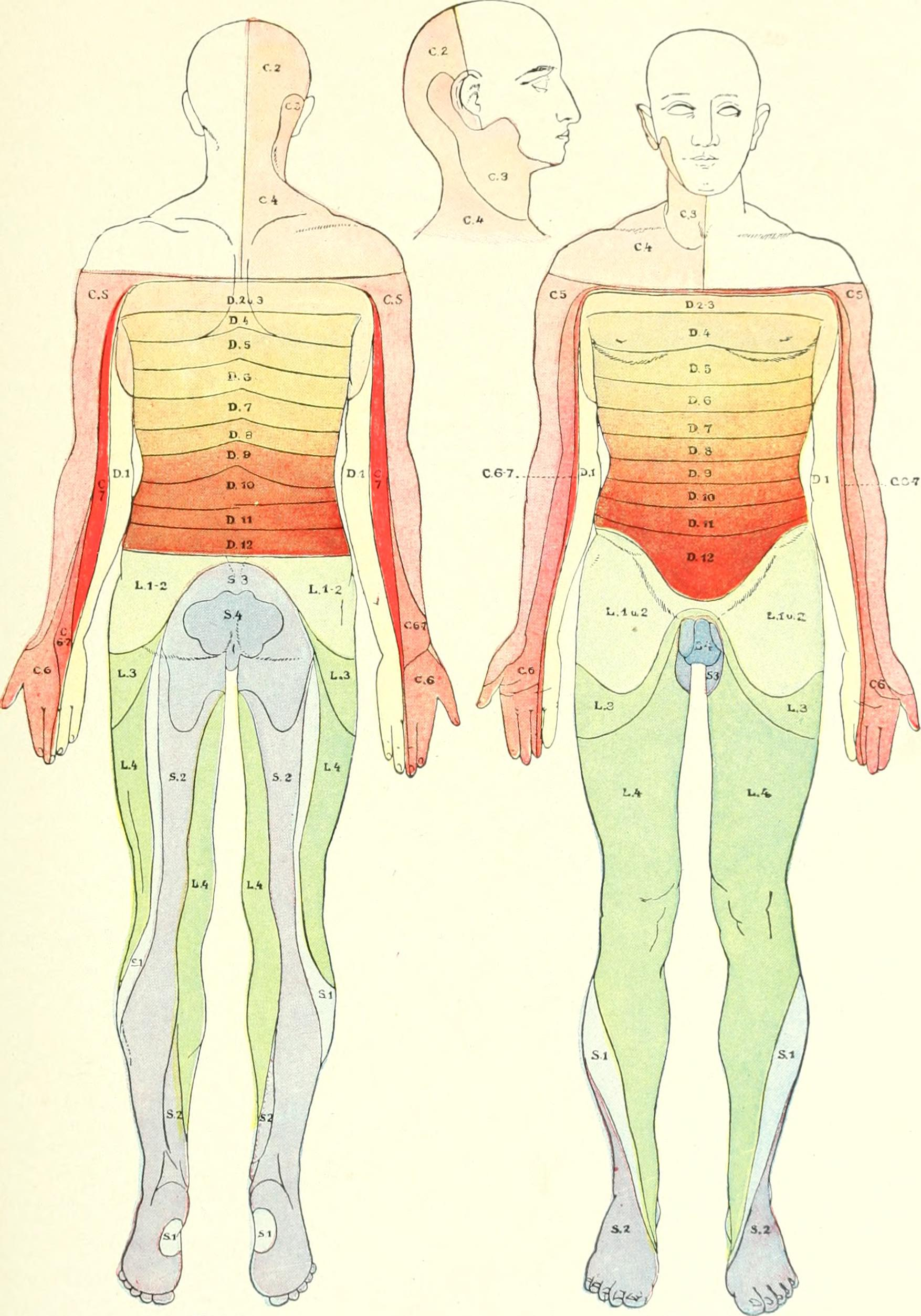
Distribution of the areas of the sensory roots upon the surface of the body

- Structure of the nervous system
- Development of the nervous system
- The spinal cord or medulla spinalis
- The brain or encephalon
  - The hindbrain or rhombencephalon
  - The midbrain or mesencephalon
  - The forebrain or prosencephalon
  - Composition and central connections of the spinal nerves
  - Pathways from the brain to the spinal cord
  - The meninges of the brain and medulla spinalis
  - The cerebrospinal fluid
- The cranial nerves
  - The olfactory nerves
  - The optic nerve
  - The oculomotor nerve
  - The trochlear nerve
  - The trigeminal nerve
  - The abducens nerve
  - The facial nerve
  - The vestibulocochlear nerve
  - The glossopharyngeal nerve
  - The vagus nerve
  - The accessory nerve
  - The hypoglossal nerve
- The spinal nerves
  - The posterior divisions
  - The anterior divisions
  - The thoracic nerves
  - The lumbosacral plexus
  - The sacral and coccygeal nerves
- The sympathetic nerves
  - The cephalic portion of the sympathetic system
  - The cervical portion of the sympathetic system
  - The thoracic portion of the sympathetic system
  - The abdominal portion of the sympathetic system
  - The pelvic portion of the sympathetic system
  - The great plexuses of the sympathetic system

== Alphabetical list ==
- Abdominal aortic plexus
- Abducens nerve
- Accessory nerve
- Accessory obturator nerve
- Alderman's nerve
- Anococcygeal nerve
- Ansa cervicalis
- Anterior interosseous nerve
- Anterior superior alveolar nerve
- Auerbach's plexus
- Auriculotemporal nerve
- Axillary nerve
- Brachial plexus
- Buccal branch of the facial nerve
- Buccal nerve
- Cardiac plexus
- Cavernous nerves
- Cavernous plexus
- Celiac ganglia
- Cervical branch of the facial nerve
- Cervical plexus
- Chorda tympani
- Ciliary ganglion
- Coccygeal nerve
- Cochlear nerve
- Common fibular nerve
- Common palmar digital nerves of median nerve
- Deep branch of the radial nerve
- Deep fibular nerve
- Deep petrosal nerve
- Deep temporal nerves
- Diagonal band of Broca
- Digastric branch of facial nerve
- Dorsal branch of ulnar nerve
- Dorsal nerve of clitoris
- Dorsal nerve of the penis
- Dorsal scapular nerve
- Esophageal plexus
- Ethmoidal nerves
- External laryngeal nerve
- External nasal nerve
- Facial nerve
- Femoral nerve
- Frontal nerve
- Gastric plexuses
- Geniculate ganglion
- Genital branch of genitofemoral nerve
- Genitofemoral nerve
- Glossopharyngeal nerve
- Greater auricular nerve
- Greater occipital nerve
- Greater petrosal nerve
- Hepatic plexus
- Hypoglossal nerve
- Iliohypogastric nerve
- Ilioinguinal nerve
- Inferior alveolar nerve
- Inferior anal nerves
- Inferior cardiac nerve
- Inferior cervical ganglion
- Inferior gluteal nerve
- Inferior hypogastric plexus
- Inferior mesenteric plexus
- Inferior palpebral nerve
- Infraorbital nerve
- Infraorbital plexus
- Infratrochlear nerve
- Intercostal nerves
- Intercostobrachial nerve
- Intermediate cutaneous nerve
- Internal carotid plexus
- Internal laryngeal nerve
- Interneuron
- Jugular ganglion
- Lacrimal nerve
- Lateral cord
- Lateral cutaneous nerve of forearm
- Lateral cutaneous nerve of thigh
- Lateral pectoral nerve
- Lateral plantar nerve
- Lateral pterygoid nerve
- Lesser occipital nerve
- Lingual nerve
- Long ciliary nerves
- Long root of the ciliary ganglion
- Long thoracic nerve
- Lower subscapular nerve
- Lumbar nerves
- Lumbar plexus
- Lumbar splanchnic nerves
- Lumboinguinal nerve
- Lumbosacral plexus
- Lumbosacral trunk
- Mandibular nerve
- Marginal mandibular branch of facial nerve
- Masseteric nerve
- Maxillary nerve
- Medial cord
- Medial cutaneous nerve of arm
- Medial cutaneous nerve of forearm
- Medial cutaneous nerve
- Medial pectoral nerve
- Medial plantar nerve
- Medial pterygoid nerve
- Median nerve
- Meissner's plexus
- Mental nerve
- Middle cardiac nerve
- Middle cervical ganglion
- Middle meningeal nerve
- Motor nerve
- Muscular branches of the radial nerve
- Musculocutaneous nerve
- Mylohyoid nerve
- Nasociliary nerve
- Nasopalatine nerve
- Nerve of pterygoid canal
- Nerve to obturator internus
- Nerve to quadratus femoris
- Nerve to the Piriformis
- Nerve to the stapedius
- Nerve to the subclavius
- Nervus intermedius
- Nervus spinosus
- Nodose ganglion
- Obturator nerve
- Oculomotor nerve
- Olfactory nerve
- Ophthalmic nerve
- Optic nerve
- Otic ganglion
- Ovarian plexus
- Palatine nerves
- Palmar branch of the median nerve
- Palmar branch of ulnar nerve
- Pancreatic plexus
- Patellar plexus
- Pelvic splanchnic nerves
- Perforating cutaneous nerve
- Perineal branches of posterior femoral cutaneous nerve
- Perineal nerve
- Petrous ganglion
- Pharyngeal branch of vagus nerve
- Pharyngeal branches of glossopharyngeal nerve
- Pharyngeal nerve
- Pharyngeal plexus
- Phrenic nerve
- Phrenic plexus
- Posterior auricular nerve
- Posterior branch of spinal nerve
- Posterior cord
- Posterior cutaneous nerve of arm
- Posterior cutaneous nerve of forearm
- Posterior cutaneous nerve of thigh
- Posterior scrotal nerves
- Posterior superior alveolar nerve
- Proper palmar digital nerves of median nerve
- Prostatic plexus (nervous)
- Pterygopalatine ganglion
- Pudendal nerve
- Pudendal plexus
- Pulmonary branches of vagus nerve
- Radial nerve
- Recurrent laryngeal nerve
- Renal plexus
- Sacral plexus
- Sacral splanchnic nerves
- Saphenous nerve
- Sciatic nerve
- Semilunar ganglion
- Sensory nerve
- Short ciliary nerves
- Sphenopalatine nerves
- Splenic plexus
- Stylohyoid branch of facial nerve
- Subcostal nerve
- Submandibular ganglion
- Suboccipital nerve
- Superficial branch of the radial nerve
- Superficial fibular nerve
- Superior cardiac nerve
- Superior cervical ganglion
- Superior ganglion of glossopharyngeal nerve
- Superior ganglion of vagus nerve
- Superior gluteal nerve
- Superior hypogastric plexus
- Superior labial nerve
- Superior laryngeal nerve
- Superior lateral cutaneous nerve of arm
- Superior mesenteric plexus
- Superior rectal plexus
- Supraclavicular nerves
- Supraorbital nerve
- Suprarenal plexus
- Suprascapular nerve
- Supratrochlear nerve
- Sural nerve
- Sympathetic trunk
- Temporal branches of the facial nerve
- Third occipital nerve
- Thoracic aortic plexus
- Thoracic splanchnic nerves
- Thoraco-abdominal nerves
- Thoracodorsal nerve
- Tibial nerve
- Transverse cervical nerve
- Trigeminal nerve
- Trochlear nerve
- Tympanic nerve
- Ulnar nerve
- Upper subscapular nerve
- Uterovaginal plexus
- Vagus nerve
- Ventral ramus
- Vesical nervous plexus
- Vestibular nerve
- Vestibulocochlear nerve
- Zygomatic branches of facial nerve
- Zygomatic nerve
- Zygomaticofacial nerve
- Zygomaticotemporal nerve

== Related topic ==
- Human brain
- Spinal cord
- Outline of the human nervous system
- List of skeletal muscles of the human body
- List of bones of the human skeleton
- Circulatory system
- Blood vessel
