= Cardiac neural crest =

Cardiac neural crest complex

Details

Identifiers
- Latin: complexus cristae neuralis cardiacus

Neural crest cells are multipotent cells required for the development of cells, tissues and organ systems. A subpopulation of neural crest cells are the cardiac neural crest complex. This complex refers to the cells found amongst the midotic placode and somite 3 destined to undergo epithelial-mesenchymal transformation and migration to the heart via pharyngeal arches 3, 4 and 6.

The cardiac neural crest complex plays a vital role in forming connective tissues that aid in outflow septation and modelling of the aortic arch arteries during early development. Ablation of the complex often leads to impaired myocardial functioning similar to symptoms present in DiGeorge syndrome. Consequently, the removal of cardiac crest cells that populate in pharyngeal arches has flow on effects on the thymus, parathyroid and thyroid gland.

Neural crest cells are a group of temporary, multipotent (can give rise to some other types of cells but not all) cells that are pinched off during the formation of the neural tube (precursor to the spinal cord and brain) and therefore are found at the dorsal (top) region of the neural tube during development. They are derived from the ectoderm germ layer, but are sometimes called the fourth germ layer because they are so important and give rise to so many other types of cells. They migrate throughout the body and create a large number of differentiated cells such as neurons, glial cells, pigment-containing cells in skin, skeletal tissue cells in the head, and many more.

Cardiac neural crest cells (CNCCs) are a type of neural crest cells that migrate to the circumpharyngeal ridge (an arc-shape ridge above the pharyngeal arches) and then into the 3rd, 4th and 6th pharyngeal arches and the cardiac outflow tract (OFT).

They extend from the otic placodes (the structure in developing embryos that will later form the ears) to the third somites (clusters of mesoderm that will become skeletal muscle, vertebrae and dermis).

The cardiac neural crest cells have a number of functions including creation of the muscle and connective tissue walls of large arteries; parts of the cardiac septum; parts of the thyroid, parathyroid and thymus glands. They differentiate into melanocytes and neurons and the cartilage and connective tissue of the pharyngeal arches. They may also contribute to the creation of the carotid body, the organ which monitors oxygen in the blood and regulates breathing.

== Pathway of the migratory cardiac neural crest cell ==
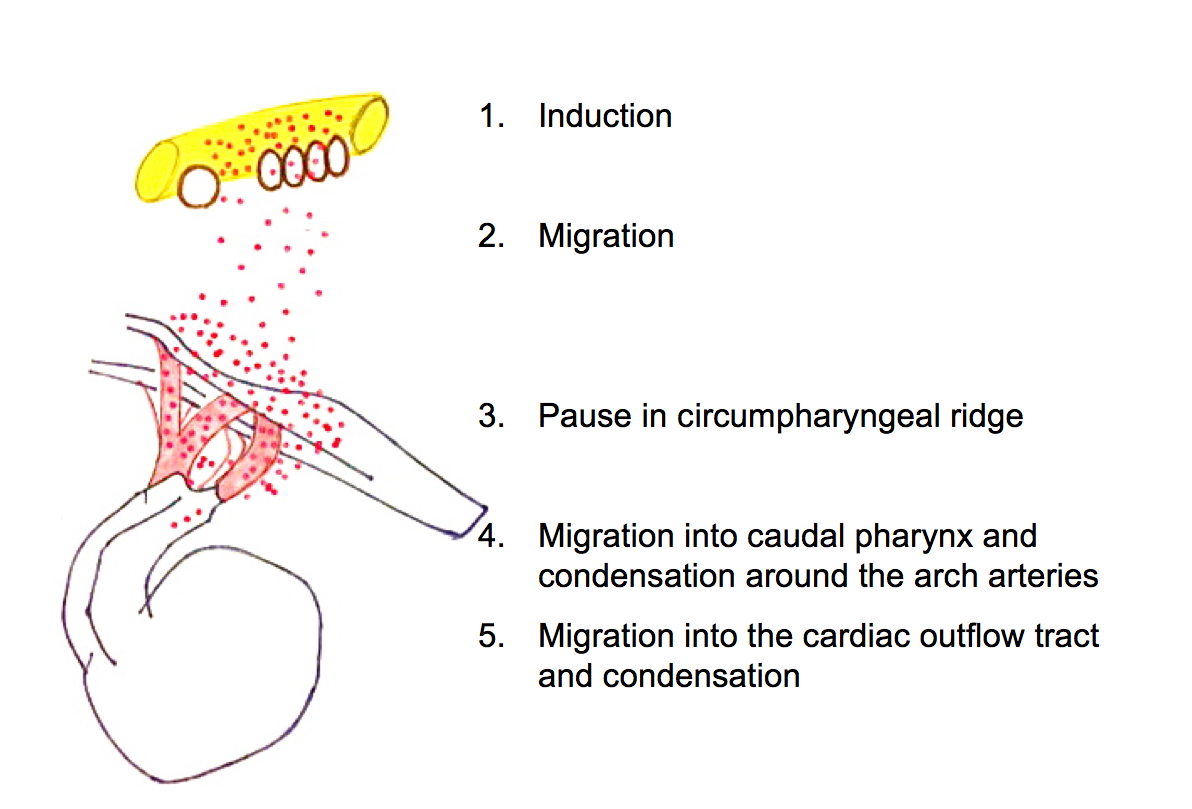
Migration of cardiac neural crest cells. CNCCs begin as part of the neural crest and become more specialized after reaching their final destination.

=== Induction ===
Neural induction is the differentiation of progenitor cells into their final designation or type. The progenitor cells which will become CNCCs are found in the epiblast about Henson's node. Progenitor cells are brought into the neural folds. Molecules such as Wnt, fibroblast growth factor (FGF) and bone morphogenetic protein (BMP) provide signals which induce the progenitor cells to become CNCCs. Little is known about the signal cascade that promotes neural crest induction. However, it is known that an intermediate level of BMP is required: if BMP is too high or too low, the cells do not migrate.

=== Initial migration ===
After induction, CNCCs lose their cell to cell contacts. This allows them to move through the extracellular matrix and interact with its components. The CNCCs, with the assistance of their filopodia and lamellipodia (actin containing extensions of cytoplasm that allow a cell to probe its path of migration), leave the neural tube and migrate along a dorsolateral pathway to the circumpharyngeal ridge. Along this pathway, CNCCs link together to form a stream of migrating cells. Cells at the front of the migration stream have a special polygonal shape and proliferate at a faster rate than trailing cells.

== Development ==
The cardiac neural crest originates from the region of cells between somite 3 and the midotic placode that migrate towards and into the cardiac outflow tract. The cells migrate from the neural tube to populate pharyngeal arches 3, 4 and 6 with the largest population of the outflow tract originating from those in pharyngeal arches 4. From here, a subpopulation of cells will develop into the endothelium of the aortic arch arteries while others will migrate into the outflow tract to form the aorticopulmonary and truncal septa. Other ectomesenchymal cells will form the thymus and parathyroid glands.

=== Epithelial-mesenchymal transition ===
Prior to migration, during a process known as epithelial-mesenchymal transition (EMT), there is a loss of cell contact, remodelling of the cytoskeleton and increased motility and interaction with extracellular components in the matrix. An important step in this process is the suppression of adhesion protein E-cadherin present on epithelial cells to initiate the migration process. This suppression mechanism occurs via the growth factor BMP signalling to turn on a transcriptional repressor Smad-interacting protein 1 (Sip1) and marks the beginning of the epithelial-mesenchymal transition.

=== Early migration ===
During migration, crest cells destined for pharyngeal arches maintain contact with each other via lamellipodia and filopodia. Short range local contact is maintained with lamellipodia whilst long range non-local contact is maintained with filopodia. During this process, connexin 43 (Cx43) regulates cell interaction by regulating the formation of channels known as gap junctions. Impaired Cx43 function in transgenic mice leads to altered coronary artery patterns and abnormal outflow tracts. Further gap junction signalling is dependent on a cadherin mediated cell adhesion formed during cross talking with p120 catenin signalling.

Appropriate outflow tract formation relies on a morphogen concentration gradient set up by fibroblast growth factor (FGF) secreting cells. Cardiac crest cells furthest away from FGF secreting cells will receive lower concentrations of FGF8 signalling than cells closer to FGF secreting cells. This allows for appropriate formation of the outflow tract. Cells located in rhombomeres 3and 5 undergo programmed cell death under signalling cues from semaphorins. The lack of cells in this region results in the formation of crest-free zones.

The process of migration requires a permissive extracellular matrix. The enzyme arginyltransferase creates this environment by adding an arginyl group onto newly synthesised proteins during post-translational modification. This process aids cells motility and ensures the proteins contained within the actin cytoskeleton is prepped for migration.

=== Circumpharyngeal ridge ===
Cell migration towards the circumpharyngeal ridge is forced to paused to allow for the formation of the caudal pharyngeal arches. Little is known about this pausing mechanism, but studies conducted in chicks have uncovered the role of mesoderm expressed factors EphrinB3 and EphrinB4 in forming fibronectin attachments.

=== Caudal pharynx and arch artery condensation ===
Pharyngeal arches are tissues composed of mesoderm-derived cells enclosed by an external ectoderm and an internal endoderm. Once the caudal pharyngeal arches are formed, cardiac neural crest complexes will migrate towards these and colonise in arches 3, 4 and 6. Cells leading this migration maintain contact with the extracellular matrix and contain filopodia which act as extensions towards the ectodermal pharyngeal arches. A range of secreted factors ensure appropriate directionality of the cells. FGF8 acts as a chemotactic attraction in directing cellular movement towards pharyngeal arch 4.

A second signalling pathway that directs crest cell movement are the family of endothelin ligands. Migrating cardiac neural crest cells will populate at the correct pharyngeal arches under signalling guidance from EphrinA and Ephrin B variations. This corresponds with receptor expression at the pharyngeal arches. Pharyngeal arch 3 expresses EphrinA and EphrinB1 receptors and pharyngeal arch 2 expresses EphrinB2 and allows for the binding of EphrinA and EphrinB variations to guide migration of the cardiac neural crest cells.

=== Aortic arch remodeling ===
The aortic arch arteries transport blood from the aorta to the head and trunk of the embryo. Normally, early development of the outflow tract begins with a single vessel that forms bilateral symmetrical branches at the aortic sac within pharyngeal arches. This process requires the elongation of the outflow tract as a prerequisite to ensure the correct series of looping and cardiac alignment. The cardiac neural crest complex then colonises in the truncal cushion and is localised to the subendothelial layer prior to spiralisation of the endocardial cushion to form the conotruncal ridges. This later undergoes remodelling to form the left-sided aortic pattern present in adult hearts. The group of cells found in the third aortic arch gives rise to common carotid arteries. Cells found in the fourth aortic arch differentiates to form the distal aortic arch and right subclavian artery, whilst cells in the sixth aortic arch develops into the pulmonary arteries. Cardiac neural crest cells express Hox genes that supports the development of arteries 3, 4 and 6 and the simultaneous regression of arteries 1 and 2. The ablation of Hox genes on cardiac neural crest cells causes defective outflow septation.

== Ablation of cardiac neural crest complex ==
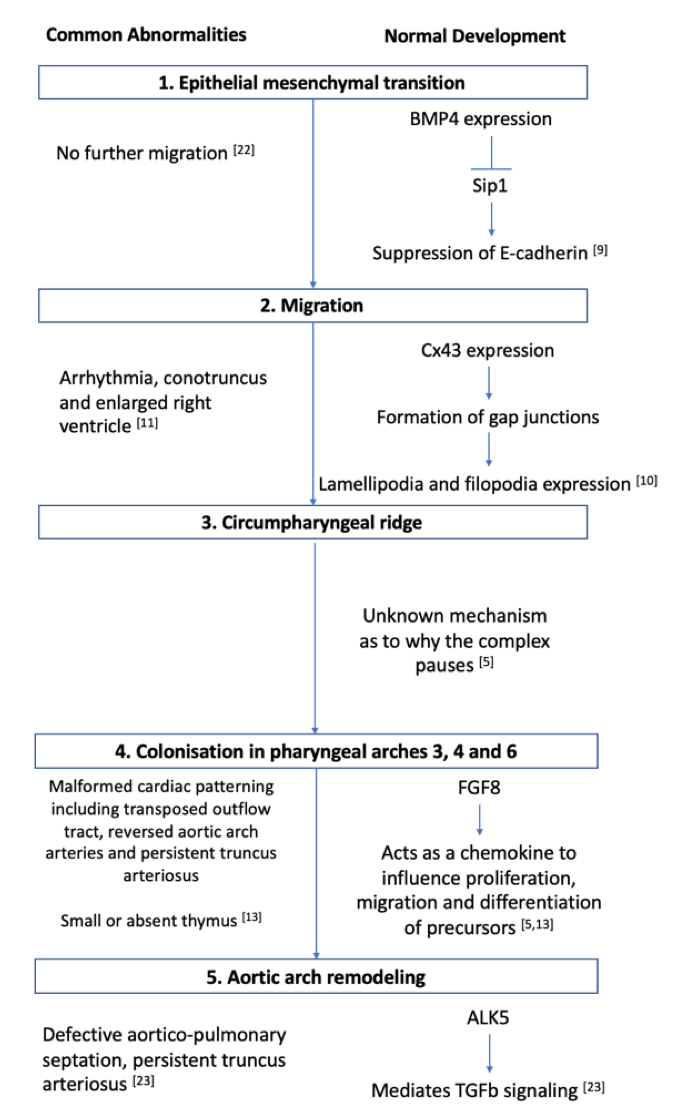
A comparison between normal development and common abnormalities that arises during cardiac neural crest differentiation

=== Cardiac outflow anomalies ===
One of the main cardiac outflow anomalies present during cardiac neural crest complex ablation is persistent truncus arteriosus. This arises when the arterial trunk fails to divide and cause the separation of pulmonary artery and aorta. This results in a lack of aorticopulmonary septum as the vessels which would normally disappear during normal development remains and interrupts the carotid vessels. The malformation of the heart and its associated great vessels depends on the extent and location of the cardiac neural crest complex ablation. Complete removal of cardiac neural crests results in persistent truncus arteriosus characterised in most cases by the presence of just one outflow valve and a ventricular septal defect. Mesencephalic neural crest cells interfere with normal development of cardiac outflow septation as its presence leads to persistent truncus arteriosus. However, the addition of trunk neural crest cells results in normal heart development.

Other outcomes of cardiac outflow anomalies includes Tetralogy of Fallot, Eisenmenger's complex, transposition of the great vessels and double outlet right ventricle.

=== Aortic arch arteries anomalies ===
Overriding aorta is caused by the abnormal looping during early development of the heart and is accompanied with ventricular septal defects. Instead of abnormal formation of the aorticopulmonary septum, partial removal of cardiac neural crest results in an overriding aorta, whereby the misplacement of the aorta is found over the ventricular septum as opposed to the left ventricle. This results in a reduction of oxygenated blood as the aorta receives some deoxygenated blood from the flow of the right ventricle. There is a reduction in the quantity of endothelial tubes of ectomesenchyme in pharyngeal arches that surround the aortic arch arteries.

Other outcomes of aortic arch artery anomalies includes a double aortic arch, variable absence of the carotid arteries and left aortic arch.

=== Functional changes to the heart ===
Functional changes to the heart becomes apparent well before structural changes are observed in the phenotype of ablated chicks. This is due to the embryo compromising morphological changes to the heart to maintain cardiac functioning via vasodilation. Despite an increase in embryonic stroke volume and cardiac output, this compensation of decreased contraction results in misalignment of the development vessels due to incomplete looping of the cardiac tube.

In an adult heart, myocardium contraction occurs via excitation-contraction coupling whereby cellular depolarisation occurs and allows an influx of calcium via voltage-gated calcium channels. A subsequent reuptake of calcium into the sarcoplasmic reticulum causes a decrease in intracellular calcium to cause myocardium relaxation. The removal of the cardiac neural crest complex causes a reduction in contractility of the myocardium. In embryos containing persistent truncus arteriosus, there is a significant 2-fold reduction in calcium currents, thereby interrupting the cardiac excitation-contraction coupling process to cause a reduction in contractility.

=== Pulmonary venous system ===
During cardiogenesis, migration of the cardiac neural crest complex occurs prior to the development of the pulmonary system. There is no visible difference in the pulmonary veins of chick embryos that developed persistent truncus arteriosus and embryos with an intact cardiac neural crest complex. Ablation of the cardiac neural crest complex do not play a role in the systemic or pulmonary venous system as no visible venous defects is observed.

=== Derivative development ===
Due to its population in pharyngeal arches, removal of the cardiac neural crest complex has flow on effects on the thymus, parathyroid and thyroid gland.

== Location ==
Into the pharyngeal arches and Truncus arteriosus (embryology), forming the aorticopulmonary septum and the smooth muscle of great arteries.

Anterior of the aorta to become the four pre-aortic ganglia: (celiac ganglion, superior mesenteric ganglion, inferior mesenteric ganglion and aortical renal ganglia).

=== Pause at the circumpharyngeal ridge ===
At the circumpharyngeal arch the CNCCs must pause in their migration while the pharyngeal arches form.

=== Migration to the pharyngeal arches ===
The CNCCs continue their migration into the newly formed pharyngeal arches, particularly the third, fourth and sixth arches. In the pharyngeal arches the CNCCs assist in the formation of the thyroid and parathyroid glands.

The leading cells have long filopodia that assist migration while cells in the middle of the migration have protrusions at their front and back allowing them to interact and communicate with leading cells, trailing cells and receive signals from the extracellular matrix.

A variety of growth factors and transcription factors in the extracellular matrix signal cells and direct them toward a specific arch. For example, signalling by FGF8 directs CNCCS to the fourth arch and keeps the cells viable.

=== Migration to the cardiac outflow tract ===
The cardiac outflow tract is a temporary structure in the developing embryo that connects the ventricles with the aortic sac. Some CNCCs migrate beyond the pharyngeal arches to the cardiac outflow tract. CNCCS in the cardiac outflow tract contribute to the formation of the cardiac ganglia and mesenchyme at the junction of the subaortic and sub pulmonary myocardium (muscular heart tissue) of the outflow tract. A smaller portion of the CNCCs migrate to the proximal outflow tract where they help to close the ventricular outflow septum.

== Molecular pathways ==
Many signaling molecules are required for the differentiation, proliferation, migration and apoptosis of the CNCCs. The molecular pathways involved include the Wnt, Notch, BMP, FGF8 and GATA families of molecules. In addition to these signaling pathways, these processes are also mediated by environmental factors including blood flow, shear stress, and blood pressure.

The CNCCs interact with the cardiogenic mesoderm cells of the primary and secondary heart fields, which are derived from the cardiac crescent and will give rise to the endocardium, myocardium, and epicardium. The CNCCs themselves are the precursors to vascular smooth muscle cells and cardiac neurons.

For example, CNCCs are required for the formation of the aorticopulmonary septum (APS) that directs cardiac outflow into two tracts: the pulmonary trunk and the aorta of the developing heart. This is an example of remodelling which is dependent on signalling back and forth between CNCCs and the cardiogenic mesoderm. If this signalling is disrupted or there are defects in the CNCCS, cardiovascular anomalies may develop. These anomalies include persistent truncus arteriosus (PTA), double outlet right ventricle (DORV), tetralogy of Fallot and DiGeorge syndrome.

=== Wnt ===
Wnt proteins are extracellular growth factors that activate intracellular signalling pathways. There are two types of pathways: canonical and non-canonical. The classic canonical Wnt pathway involves β-catenin protein as a signaling mediator. Wnt maintains β-catenin by preventing against Proteasome degradation. Thus, β-catenin is stabilized in the presence of Wnt and regulates gene transcription through interaction with TCF/LEF transcription factors. The canonical Wnt/β-catenin pathway is important for control of cell proliferation. The non-canonical Wnt pathway is independent of β-catenin and has an inhibitory effect on canonical Wnt signaling.

Wnt signaling pathways play a role in CNCC development as well as OFT development. In mice, decrease of β-catenin results in a decrease in the proliferation of CNCCs. Downregulation of the Wnt coreceptor Lrp6 leads to a reduction of CNCCs in the dorsal neural tube and in the pharyngeal arches, and results in ventricular, septal, and OFT defects. Canonical Wnt signaling is especially important for cell cycle regulation of CNCC development and the initiation of CNCC migration. Non-canonical Wnt signaling plays a greater role in promoting cardiac differentiation and OFT development.

=== Notch ===
Notch is a transmembrane protein whose signaling is required for differentiation of CNCCs to vascular smooth muscle cells and for proliferation of cardiac myocytes (muscle cells of the heart). In mice, disruption of Notch signaling results in aortic arch branching defects and pulmonary stenosis, as well as a defect in the development of the smooth muscle cells of the sixth aortic arch artery, which is the precursor to the pulmonary artery. In humans, mutations in Notch most often result in bicuspid aortic valve disease and calcification of the aortic valve.

=== Bone morphogenetic proteins ===
Bone morphogenetic proteins (BMPs) are required for neural crest cell migration into the cardiac cushions (precursors to heart valves and septa) and for differentiation of neural crest cells to smooth muscle cells of the aortic arch arteries. In neural crest–specific Alk2-deficient embryos, the cardiac cushions of the outflow tract are deficient in cells because of defects in neural crest cell migration.

=== Fibroblast growth factor 8 ===
Fibroblast growth factor 8 (FGF8) transcription factors are essential for regulating the addition of secondary heart field cells into the cardiac outflow tract. FGF8 mouse mutants have a range of cardiac defects including underdeveloped arch arteries and transposition of the great arteries.

=== GATA ===
GATA transcription factors, which are complex molecules that bind to the DNA sequence GATA, play a critical role in cell lineage differentiation restriction during cardiac development. The primary function of GATA6 in cardiovascular development is to regulate the morphogenetic patterning of the outflow tract and aortic arch. When GATA6 is inactivated in CNCCs, various cardiovascular defects such as persistent truncus arteriosus and interrupted aortic arch may occur. This phenotype (anomaly) was also observed when GATA6 was inactivated within vascular smooth muscle cells. GATA6 in combination with Wnt (Wnt2-GATA6) plays a role in the development of the posterior pole of the heart (the inflow tract).

== CNCCS and ischaemic heart disease ==
There is interest amongst researchers as to whether CNCCs can be used to repair human heart tissue. Heart attacks in humans are common and their rate of mortality is high. There are emergency treatments that hospitals can administer, such as angioplasty or surgery, but after that patients will likely be on medication for the long term and are more susceptible to heart attacks in the future. Other complications of heart attacks include cardiac arrhythmias and heart failure.

Although CNCCs are important in embryos, some CNCCs are retained in a dormant state to adulthood where they are called neural crest stem cells. In 2005, Tomita transplanted neural crest stem cells from mammal hearts to the neural crest of chick embryos. These CNCCs were shown to migrate into the developing heart of the chick using the same dorsolateral pathway as the CNCCs, and differentiate into neural and glial cells.

Tamura's study of 2011 examined the fate of CNCCs after a heart attack (myocardial infarction) in young mice. The CNCCs in the young mice were tagged with enhanced green fluorescent protein (EGFP) and then traced. Tagged CNCCs were concentrated in the cardiac outflow tract, and some were found in the ventricular myocardium. These cells were also shown to be differentiating into cardiomyocytes as the heart grew. Although less were found, these EGFP-labelled CNCCs were still present in the adult heart. When a heart attack was induced, the CNCCs aggregated in the ischemic border zone area (an area of damaged tissue that can still be saved) and helped contribute to the regeneration of the tissue to some extent via differentiation into cardiomyocytes to replace the necrotic tissue.
