= Prevertebral ganglia =

Group of sympathetic ganglia

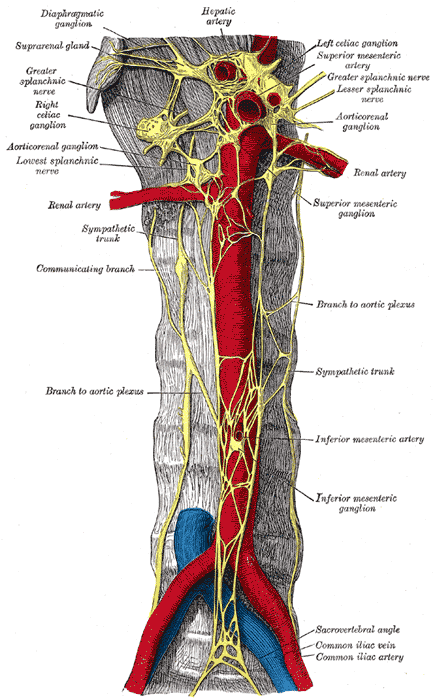
- Abdominal portion of the sympathetic trunk, with the celiac plexus and hypogastric plexus.

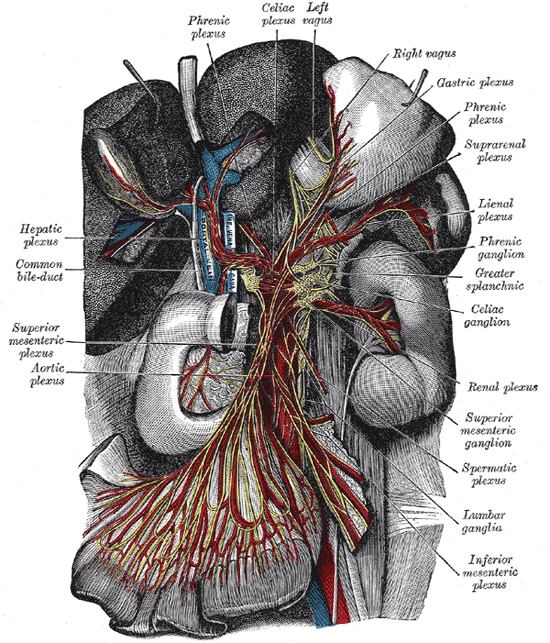
- The celiac ganglia with the sympathetic plexuses of the abdominal viscera radiating from the ganglia.

Prevertebral ganglia (or collateral ganglia, or preaortic ganglia) are sympathetic ganglia situated along the midline, anterior to the aorta and the vertebral column. The prevertebral ganglia are the celiac ganglia (including the aorticorenal ganglia), the superior mesenteric ganglion, and the inferior mesenteric ganglion.

The paravertebral ganglia, meanwhile, are the segmental ganglia of each the sympathetic trunk situated along either side of the midline.

== See also ==
- Autonomic ganglion
- Prevertebral plexus
- Dogiel cells

== Additional images ==
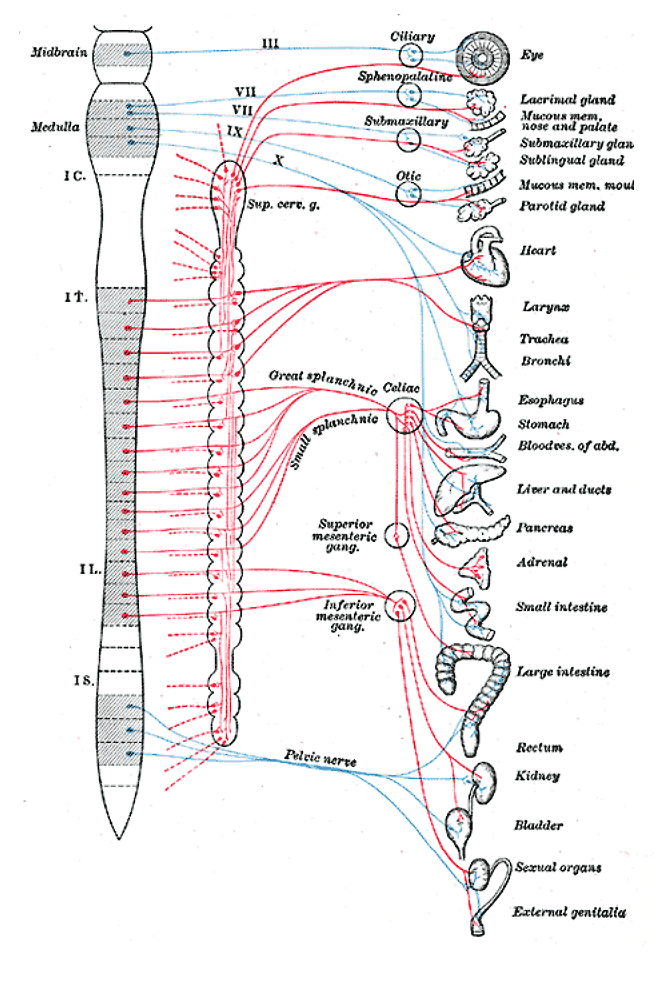
Sympathetic (red) and parasympathetic (blue) nervous system
