= Mesenteric plexus =

Mesenteric plexus may refer to:

- Superior mesenteric plexus
- Intermesenteric plexus
- Inferior mesenteric plexus
