= Aortic plexus =

Aortic plexus may refer to:

- abdominal aortic plexus
- thoracic aortic plexus
