= Cystic plexus =

The cystic plexus is the derivation of the hepatic plexus, which is the largest offshoot from the celiac plexus.

Formed by branches from the celiac plexus, the right and left vagi and the right phrenic nerve, parasympathetic nerves are motor to the musculature of the gall bladder and bile ducts, but inhibitory to the sphincters. Sympathetic nerves derived from thoracic seven to nine segments are vasomotor and motor to sphincters.

It supplies the gall bladder, common hepatic duct, cystic duct and upper part of the bile duct. The lower part of the bile duct is supplied by the nerve plexus around the superior pancreaticoduodenal artery.
