= Phrenic plexus =

Nerve fiber network of the abdomen

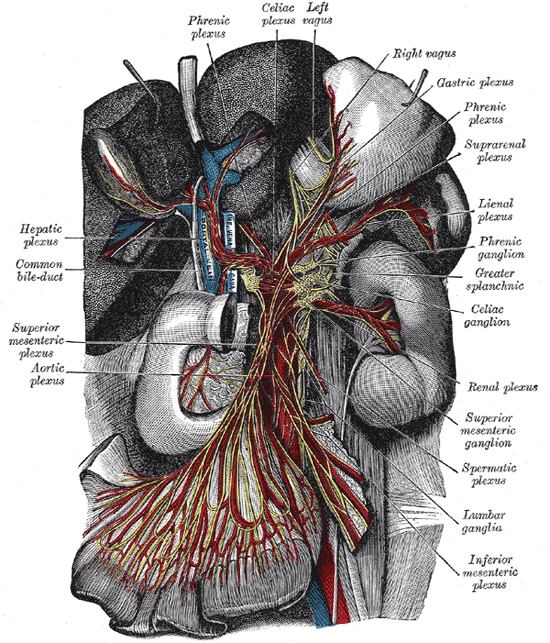
- The celiac ganglia with the sympathetic plexuses of the abdominal viscera radiating from the ganglia. (Phrenic plexus labeled at upper left.)

Details

Identifiers
- Latin: plexus phrenicus

The phrenic plexus accompanies the inferior phrenic artery to the diaphragm, some filaments passing to the suprarenal gland.

It arises from the upper part of the celiac ganglion, and is larger on the right than on the left side.

It receives one or two branches from the phrenic nerve.

At the point of junction of the right phrenic plexus with the phrenic nerve is a small ganglion (ganglion phrenicum).

This plexus distributes branches to the inferior vena cava, and to the suprarenal and hepatic plexuses.
