= Posterior gastric branches of posterior vagal trunk =

Details
- From: Posterior vagal trunk
- To: Celiac branches of vagus nerve

Identifiers
- Latin: rami gastrici posteriores trunci vagalis posterioris
- TA98: A14.2.01.180
- TA2: 6680
- FMA: 6719

The posterior gastric branches of posterior vagal trunk are branches of the posterior vagal trunk which supply the stomach.

Posterior gastric branches supply the posterior surface of stomach and its terminal branches are known as "crow's foot" which supply the [pyloric antrum] and the posterior wall of pyloric canal.
