= Hepatic plexus =

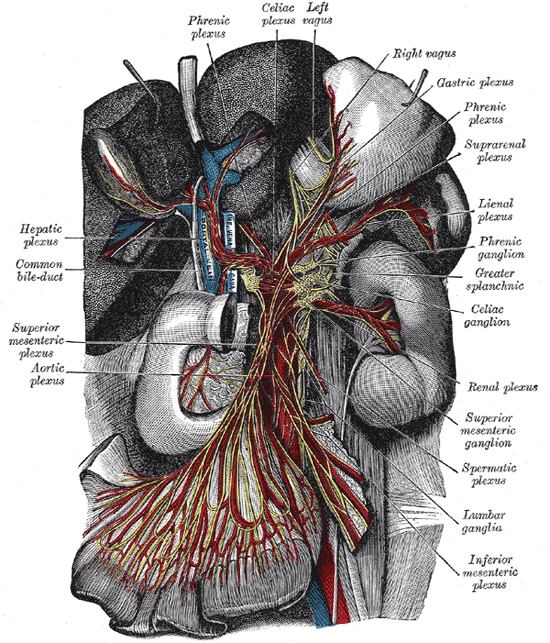
- The celiac ganglia with the sympathetic plexuses of the abdominal viscera radiating from the ganglia. (Hepatic plexus labeled at center left.)

Details

Identifiers
- Latin: plexus hepaticus
- TA98: A14.3.03.022
- TA2: 6697
- FMA: 6632

The hepatic plexus is a sympathetic and parasympathetic nerve plexus that provides innervation to the parenchyma of the liver as well as contributing innervation to some other abdominal structures.

Its sympathetic component is derived from the coeliac and superior mesenteric plexuses; its parasympathetic component is derived from the anterior and posterior vagal trunks.

== Anatomy ==
=== Afferents ===
==== Sympathetic ====
The plexus receives post-ganglionic sympathetic afferents from the celiac plexus, and the superior mesenteric plexus. The hepatic plexus is the largest derivative of the celiac plexus.

==== Parasympathetic ====
The plexus receives pre-ganglionic parasymathetic afferents primarily from the anterior vagal trunk, with a lesser contribution from the posterior vagal trunk. The anterior vagal trunk issues one or more hepatic branches of anterior vagal trunk that pass in the superior portion of the lesser omentum to reach the hepatic plexus.

=== Efferents and distribution ===
The plexus is the primary source of innervation for the parenchyma of the liver. Efferents of the plexus accompany the branches of the portal triad through the porta hepatis into the liver, ultimately reaching as far as the individual hepatocytes.

Multiple fine branches arise from the plexus to be distributed to the gallbladder, and the extrahepatic bile ducts. Some authors have described a distinct cystic plexus that arises to provide this innervation.

Some accompany the gastroomental artery to provide a minor contribution to the innervation of the stomach. Some efferents from the plexus accompany the right gastric artery to reach and contribute to the innervation of the pylorus. Some accompany the gastroduodenal artery and its branches to reach the pylorus, proximal duodenum, and the pancreas.

== Physiology ==
=== Hepatic ===
Other than their role in mediating vasoconstriction, the function of the plexus' efferents is unclear. Efferents are apparently involved in regulating hepatic metabolism, and sinusoidal blood flow control. The plexus is however not functionally essential, as demonstrated by the continued functioning of transplanted livers where the efferents of the plexus are cut during the transplantation process.

Efferents to the liver are involved in cholinergic, aminergic, peptidergic, and nitrergic neurotransmission.

=== Biliary ===
The parasympathetic component of the plexus' efferents to the gallbladder and extrahepatic bile duct is visceral motor and innervates the smooth muscle in the walls of the ducts and gallbladder.
