= LBX2 =

Protein-coding gene in the species Homo sapiens

Identifiers
- Aliases: LBX2, LP3727, ladybird homeobox 2
- External IDs: OMIM: 607164; MGI: 1342288; GeneCards: LBX2

Gene location (Human)
Chr.	Chromosome 2 (human)
Band	2p13.1	Start	74,497,517 bp
Band	2p13.1	End	74,503,316 bp

Gene location (Mouse)
Chr.	Chromosome 6 (mouse)
Band	6 C3|6 35.94 cM	Start	83,063,348 bp
Band	6 C3|6 35.94 cM	End	83,065,224 bp
RNA expression pattern
Bgee	Human / Mouse (ortholog); Top expressed in: right lobe of liver; duodenum; bone marrow cell; mucosa of transverse colon; stromal cell of endometrium; gallbladder; epithelium of colon; gonad; granulocyte; blood / Top expressed in: female urethra; morula; embryo; embryo; paramesonephric duct; genital tubercle; adrenal gland; tail of embryo; surface ectoderm; adrenal cortex; More reference expression data
BioGPS	n/a
Gene ontology
Molecular function	DNA binding; DNA-binding transcription factor activity, RNA polymerase II-specific
Cellular component	nucleus
Biological process	regulation of transcription, DNA-templated; transcription, DNA-templated; regulation of transcription by RNA polymerase II
Sources:Amigo / QuickGO
Orthologs
Databases	NCBI: entry; OMA: entry
Species	Human	Mouse
Entrez	85474	16815
Ensembl	ENSG00000179528	ENSMUSG00000034968
UniProt	Q6XYB7	Q9WUN8
RefSeq (mRNA)	NM_001282430; NM_001009812	NM_010692
RefSeq (protein)	NP_001009812; NP_001269359	NP_034822
Location (UCSC)	Chr 2: 74.5 – 74.5 Mb	Chr 6: 83.06 – 83.07 Mb
PubMed search
- Wikidata
View/Edit Human	View/Edit Mouse

Ladybird homeobox 2 (LBX2) is a protein that is encoded by the LBX2 gene, located on the second chromosome in humans, and on the sixth chromosome in mice.

LBX2 belongs to the homeobox gene family, which plays important roles in embryonic development and tissue differentiation. The protein encoded by LBX2 functions as a transcription factor and is expressed in various tissues, including the heart, skeletal muscle, and nervous system. LBX2 is involved in the regulation of cardiac development, particularly in the formation of the atrial septum. Mutations or dysregulation of LBX2 have been associated with an increased risk of congenital heart defects, specifically atrial septal defects.

LBX2 plays a significant role in the development of various organs, such as the heart, and has been implicated in the growth of certain cancers.

== Gene structure ==
The LBX2 gene shares similarities with its rodent counterpart, also named LBX2, in genomic structure. Both human and rodent LBX2 genes are composed of two exons separated by an intron.

The upstream region of the mouse LBX2, which shares a high degree of similarity to its human counterpart, has also been observed to be a regulatory sequence that influences the expression of reporter genes. This regulatory influence is tissue-specific, highlighting the complexity of gene expression in different biological contexts.

== Expression and function ==
LBX2 is a member of the ladybird family of homeobox genes, which are crucial in developmental processes. In rodent studies, LBX2 has been found to be expressed in various developing systems, notably the urogenital system, eye, and brain.

CRISPR/Cas9 technology has been used to create zebrafish models lacking LBX2. Observations of these modified zebrafish revealed several notable differences compared to normal specimens, including:

- Enlarged heart chambers (the atrium and ventricle)
- Disorganized distribution of cardiac myocytes
- Delayed migration of cardiac neural crest cells

These findings suggest that LBX2 plays a significant role in the development of the heart.

== Clinical significance ==
=== Alström syndrome ===
While polymorphisms in the LBX2 gene have been identified, studies indicate that mutations in the coding region of LBX2 do not account for Alström syndrome, a genetic disorder characterized by ocular and urogenital abnormalities.

=== Atrial septal defect ===
A study aimed at identifying causal genes for ostium secundum atrial septal defect (ASD) discovered that a rare missense mutation in LBX2 was associated with this condition.

=== Ovarian cancer ===
Laboratory studies have indicated that LBX2 promotes rapid cell proliferation in ovarian cancers and is a key gene involved in ovarian cancer formation. It has been identified as a potential target for therapeutic interventions.

=== Lung cancer ===
Lung adenocarcinoma (LUAD) is the most common type of lung cancer. Studies have shown that reducing LBX2 expression inhibits LUAD growth, whereas its overexpression promotes tumor growth and invasiveness. In most LUAD cases, LBX2 is expressed at elevated levels, correlating with poor clinical outcomes.

== Conclusion ==
LBX2 is a crucial gene involved in development and disease processes. Its role in the development of organs, particularly in the cardiac and reproductive systems, alongside its implications in cancer biology, emphasise its importance to the healthy development of humans, rodents and zebrafish.
