= Gastric nerve =

Gastric nerve may refer to:

- Celiac ganglia, large nerve ganglia that innervate most of the digestive tract
- Vagus nerve, the tenth cranial nerve
