= Renal branches of vagus nerve =

Nerve anatomy associated with the human kidney

Details

Identifiers
- Latin: rami renales nervi vagi
- TA98: A14.2.01.183
- TA2: 6683
- FMA: 6670

The renal branches of vagus nerve are small branches which provide parasympathetic innervation to the kidney.

== See also ==
- Renal plexus
