= Superior mesenteric =

Superior mesenteric can refer to:

- Superior mesenteric artery
- Superior mesenteric vein
- Superior mesenteric lymph nodes
- Superior mesenteric ganglion
