= Prevertebral plexus =

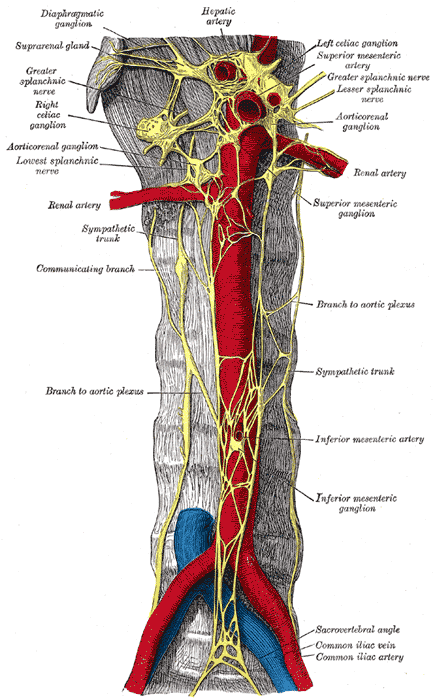
- Abdominal portion of the sympathetic trunk, with the celiac plexus and hypogastric plexus.

A prevertebral plexus is a nerve plexus which branches from a prevertebral ganglion.
