= Hepatic branches of anterior vagal trunk =

Details
- From: anterior vagal trunk

Identifiers
- Latin: rami hepatici trunci vagalis anterioris, rami hepatici nervi vagi
- TA98: A14.2.01.177
- TA2: 6677
- FMA: 6666

The hepatic branches of anterior vagal trunk are branches of the anterior vagal trunk that provide parasympathetic innervation the liver, and gallbladder. Each anterior vagal trunk (it may be doubled or tripled) issues 1-2 hepatic branches which pass through the superior part of the omentum minus to reach and join the hepatic (nervous) plexus before proceeding to the porta hepatis. The anterior vagal trunk is the main source of parasymathetic afferents for the hepatic plexus.

== Clinical significance ==
Selective vagotomy of the anterior vagal trunk can be performed distal to the hepatic branch (in conjunction with sectioning the posterior vagal trunk distal to its coeliac branches) to curb gastric secretion, however, this often results in gastric stasis (to avoid this complication, a highly selective vagotomy that sections only branches to the gastric fundus and body may be performed instead).
