= Suprarenal plexus =

Network of nerves near the adrenal gland

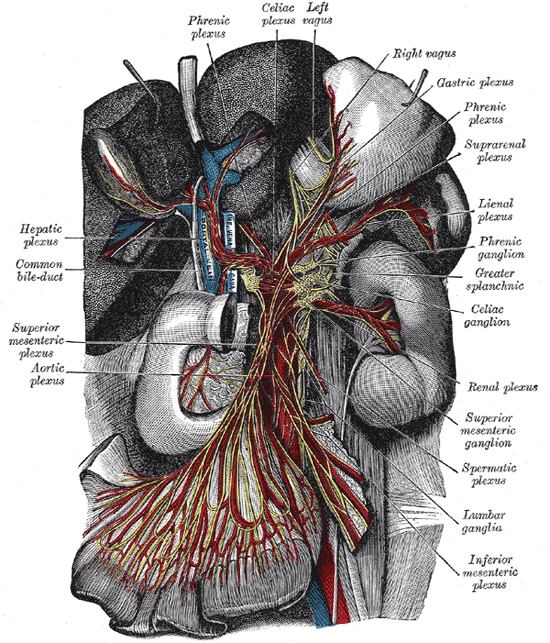
- The celiac ganglia with the sympathetic plexuses of the abdominal viscera radiating from the ganglia. (Suprarenal plexus labeled at upper right.)

Details

Identifiers
- Latin: plexus suprarenalis
- TA98: A14.3.03.026
- TA2: 6701
- FMA: 6635

The suprarenal plexus is formed by branches from the celiac plexus, from the celiac ganglion, and from the phrenic and greater splanchnic nerves, a ganglion being formed at the point of junction with the latter nerve.

The plexus supplies the suprarenal gland, being distributed chiefly to its medullary portion; its branches are remarkable for their large size in comparison with that of the organ they supply.
