= Gastric plexuses =

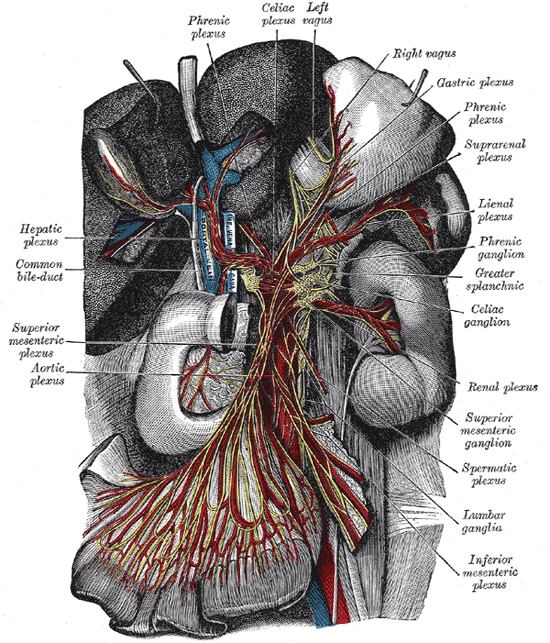
- The celiac ganglia with the sympathetic plexuses of the abdominal viscera radiating from the ganglia. (Gastric plexus labeled at upper right.)

Details

Identifiers
- Latin: plexus gastrici, plexus nervorum gastricorum
- TA98: A14.3.03.024
- TA2: 6699
- FMA: 75496

The superior gastric plexus (gastric or coronary plexus) accompanies the left gastric artery along the lesser curvature of the stomach, and joins with branches from the left vagus nerve.

The term "inferior gastric plexus" is sometimes used to describe a continuation of the hepatic plexus.

== Additional images ==
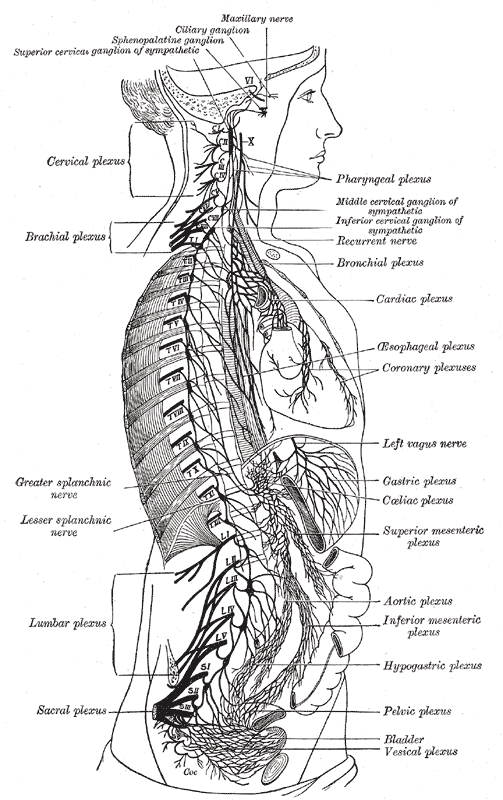
The right sympathetic chain and its connections with the thoracic, abdominal, and pelvic plexuses.
