= Pancreatic plexus =

Division of the celiac plexus in the abdomen

Details
- Innervates: Pancreas

Identifiers
- Latin: plexus pancreaticus
- TA98: A14.3.03.025
- TA2: 6700
- FMA: 21540

In human neuroanatomy, the pancreatic plexus is a division of the celiac plexus (coeliac plexus) in the abdomen. 10-20% of nerve fibers of the posterior hepatic plexus form the pancreatic plexus.
