= Aorticorenal ganglion =

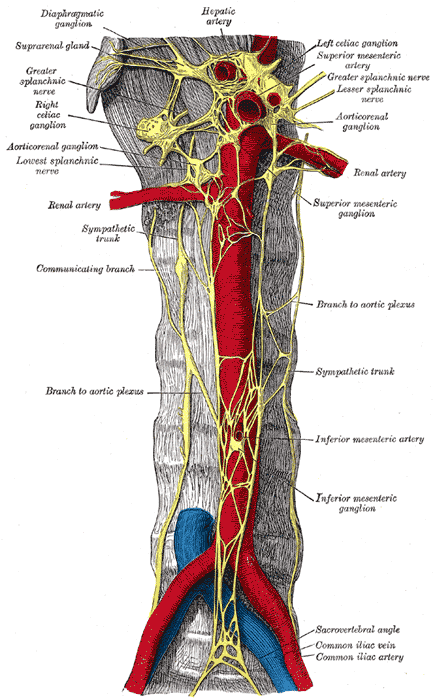
- Abdominal portion of the sympathetic trunk, with the celiac plexus and hypogastric plexus (aorticorenal ganglion labeled at right, fourth from the top)

Details
- From: celiac ganglion

Identifiers
- Latin: ganglia aorticorenalia
- TA98: A14.3.03.028
- TA2: 6640
- FMA: 77585

The aorticorenal ganglion is composed of the superior mesenteric, renal, and inferior mesenteric ganglia. This is distinct from the celiac ganglia. However, they are part of the preaortic ganglia.

Sympathetic input to the gut comes from the sympathetic chain next to the thoracic vertebrae. The upper nerve supply arrives from cell bodies at the levels of T5–T9, leaves the sympathetic chain by the greater splanchnic nerve, and synapses in the celiac ganglion before proceeding on to the foregut. Below this the lesser splanchnic nerve arises from T10–T11, leaves the sympathetic chain and synapses at the aorticorenal ganglion before going on to also supply the kidney and upper ureter. Below this the least splanchnic nerve arises from T12 and leaves the sympathetic chain to synapse at the renal plexus.
