= Anterior vagal trunk =

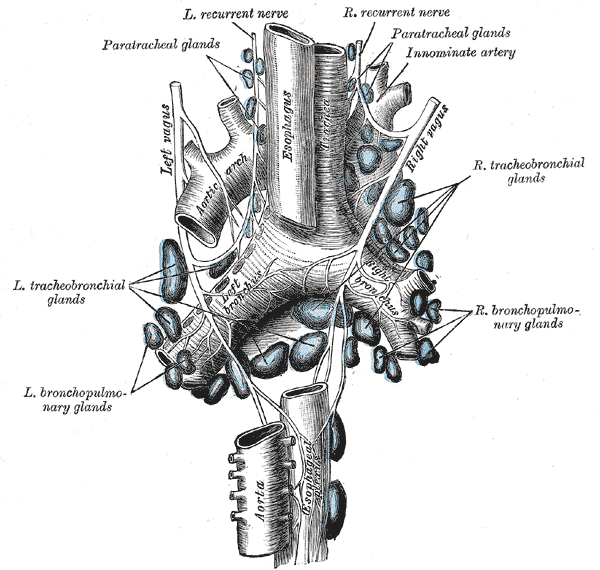
- The tracheobronchial lymph nodes

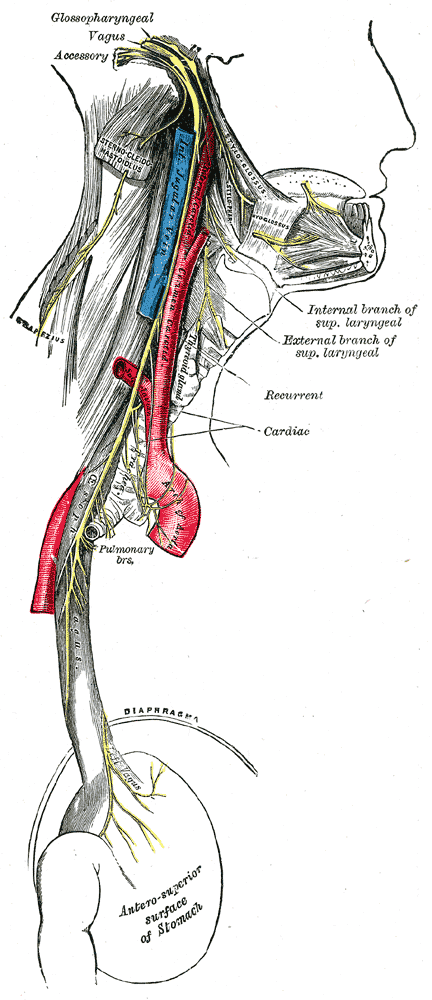
- Course and distribution of the glossopharyngeal, vagus, and accessory nerves.

Details

Identifiers
- Latin: truncus vagalis anterior
- TA98: A14.2.01.174
- TA2: 6674
- FMA: 6226

The anterior vagal trunk is one of the two divisions (the other being the posterior vagal trunk) into which the vagus nerve splits as it passes through the esophageal hiatus to enter the abdominal cavity. The anterior and posterior vagal trunks represent the inferior continuation of the esophageal nervous plexus inferior to the diaphragm. The majority of nerve fibres in the anterior vagal trunk are derived from the left vagus nerve.

The anterior vagal trunk is responsible mainly for providing parasympathetic innervation to the lesser curvature of the stomach, pylorus, gallbladder, and biliary apparatus.

== Anatomy ==
=== Branches ===
- Hepatic branches which supply the liver, gallbladder, and biliary apparatus.
- Celiac branches which contributes parasympathetic afferents to the celiac plexus.
- Anterior gastric branches which supply the stomach.
- Anterior and posterior nerves of Latarjet which innervate the pylorus, and proximal duodenum.

== Clinical significance ==
The anterior vagal trunk and its branches are at risk of injury during surgeries of the distal oesophagus, stomach, proximal duodenum, gallbladder, and biliary tract.
