= Splenic plexus =

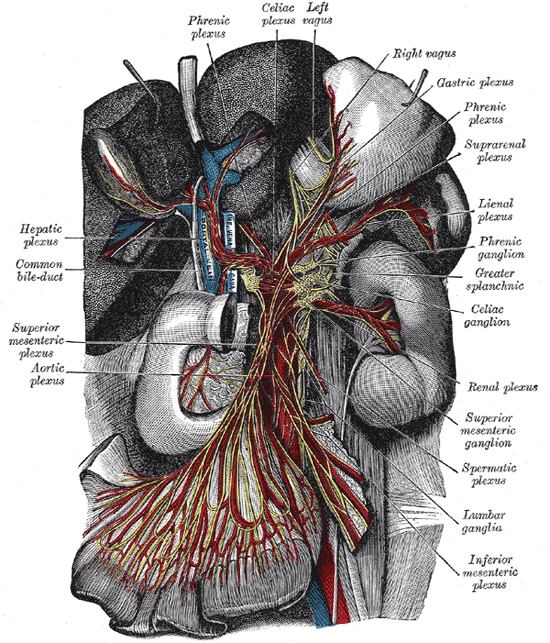
- The celiac ganglia with the sympathetic plexuses of the abdominal viscera radiating from the ganglia. (Lienal plexus labeled at upper right.)

Details
- Innervates: Spleen

Identifiers
- Latin: plexus splenicus
- TA98: A14.3.03.023
- TA2: 6698
- FMA: 6634

The splenic plexus (lienal plexus in older texts) is formed by branches from the celiac plexus, the left celiac ganglion, and from the right vagus nerve.

It accompanies the lienal artery to the spleen, giving off, in its course, subsidiary plexuses along the various branches of the artery.
