= Iliac plexus =

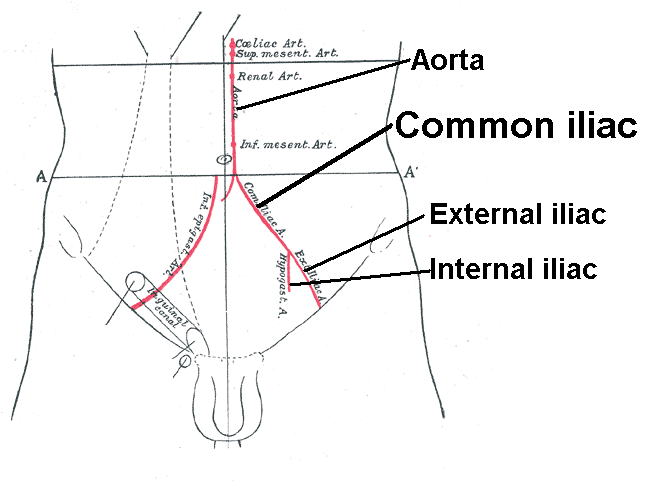
- Front of abdomen; the markings show the pathway of the aorta and the deriving arteries. The iliax plexus only sheaths the commen iliac artery.

Details
- From: Abdominal aortic plexus

Identifiers
- Latin: Plexus iliacus
- TA98: A14.3.03.043
- TA2: 6659
- FMA: 21537

The iliac plexus, also called iliac nerve plexus, is a twin nerve plexus covering the common iliac arteries. The iliac plexus originates from the aortic bifurcation developing from the abdominal aortic plexus. The superior hypogastric plexus is also a continuation of the abdominal aortic plexus.

== Sources ==
- Aumüller, Gerhard; et al. (2010). Anatomie [Anatomy]. Duale Reihe (in German) (2 ed.). Stuttgart: Thieme. p. 787. ISBN 978-3-13-136042-7.
