= Abdominal aortic plexus =

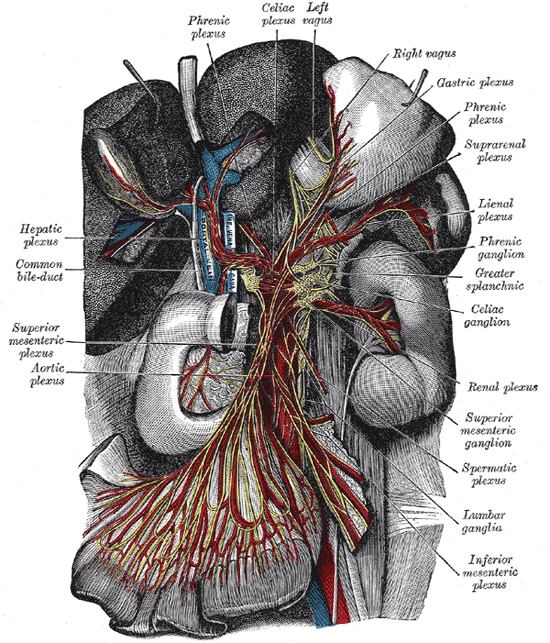
- The celiac ganglia with the sympathetic plexuses of the abdominal viscera radiating from the ganglia (aortic plexus labeled at left)

Details
- From: Celiac plexus, superior mesenteric plexus
- To: Superior hypogastric plexus

Identifiers
- Latin: plexus aorticus abdominalis
- TA98: A14.3.03.019
- TA2: 6695
- FMA: 6640

The abdominal aortic plexus (not to be confused with the thoracic aortic plexus) is formed by branches derived, on either side, from the celiac plexus and ganglia, and receives filaments from some of the lumbar ganglia.

It is situated upon the sides and front of the aorta, between the origins of the superior and inferior mesenteric arteries.

From this plexus arise part of the spermatic, the iliac, the inferior mesenteric and the hypogastric plexuses; it also distributes filaments to the inferior vena cava.

The abdominal aortic plexus contains the spermatic ganglia, the inferior mesenteric ganglion, and the prehypogastric ganglion.

== Additional images ==
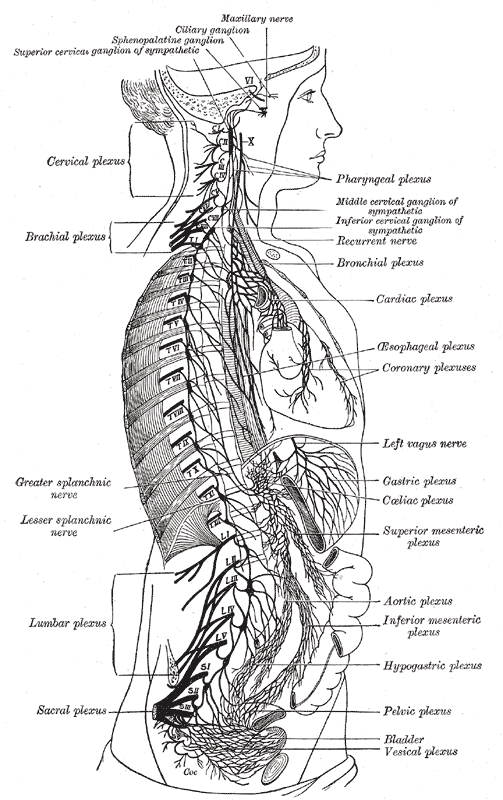
The right sympathetic chain and its connections with the thoracic, abdominal, and pelvic plexuses.

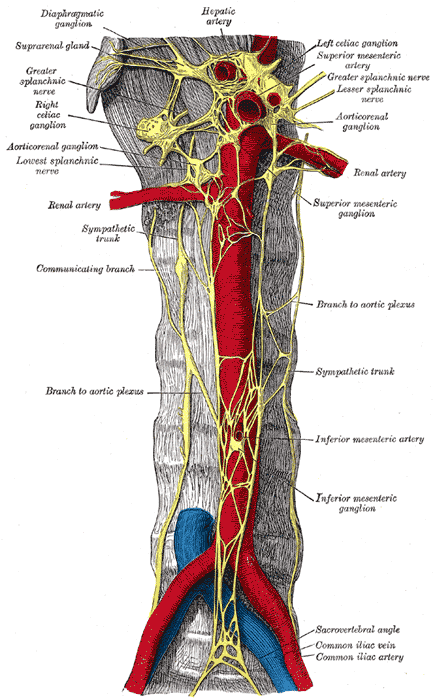
Abdominal portion of the sympathetic trunk, with the celiac and hypogastric plexuses.

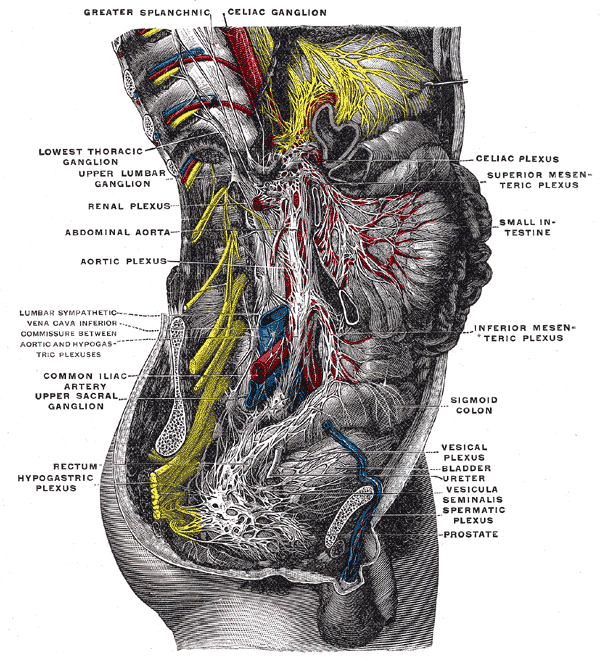
Lower half of right sympathetic cord.
