= Anterior gastric branches of anterior vagal trunk =

Details
- From: Anterior vagal trunk
- To: Celiac branches of vagus nerve

Identifiers
- Latin: rami gastrici anteriores trunci vagalis anterioris
- TA98: A14.2.01.175
- TA2: 6675
- FMA: 6718

The anterior gastric branches of anterior vagal trunk are branches of the anterior vagal trunk which supply the stomach.

One long branch of it runs from the lesser curvature or parallel to it in lesser omentum as far as the pyloric antrum to fan out into branches in a way like the digits of a crow's foot to supply the pyloric antrum and the anterior wall of pyloric canal.
