= Thoracic splanchnic nerves =

Group of nerves in the thorax

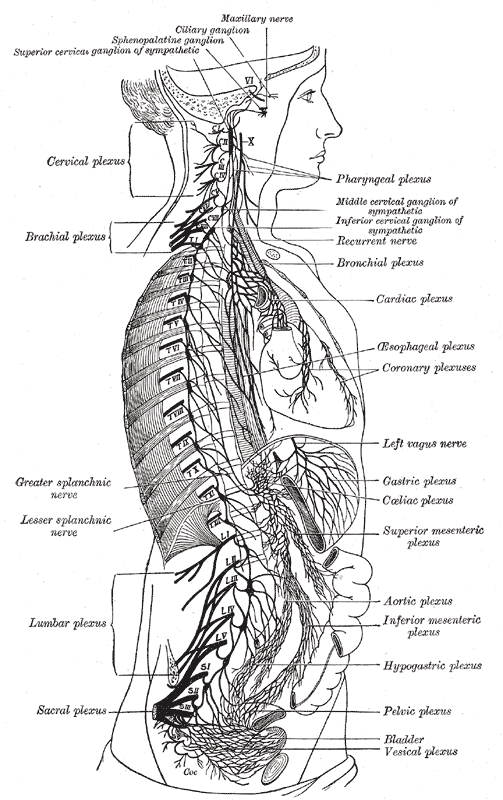
- The right sympathetic chain and its connections with the thoracic, abdominal, and pelvic plexuses. (Greater and lesser splanchnic nerves labeled at left.)

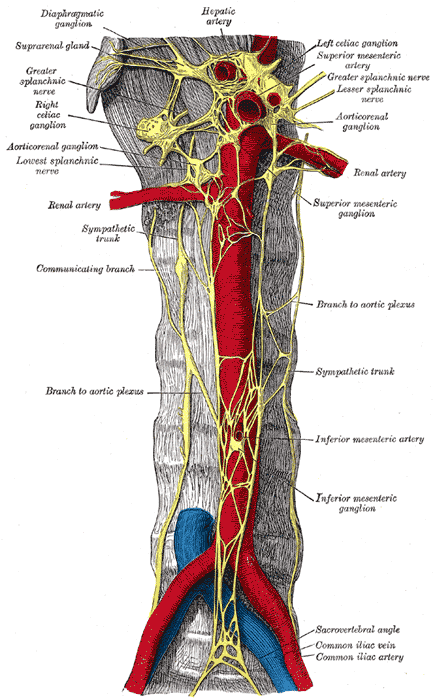
- Abdominal portion of the sympathetic trunk, with the celiac and hypogastric plexuses. (Greater splanchnic and lowest splanchnic labeled at upper left. Greater splanchnic and lesser splanchnic labeled at upper right.)

Details
- From: Thoracic ganglia
- Innervates: Greater splanchnic nerve: celiac ganglia lesser splanchnic nerve: superior mesenteric ganglion and aorticorenal ganglion least splanchnic nerve: renal plexus

Identifiers
- TA98: A14.3.01.028; A14.3.01.032; A14.3.01.030
- TA2: 6631, 6632, 6634
- FMA: 6280

Thoracic splanchnic nerves are splanchnic nerves that arise from the sympathetic trunk in the thorax and travel inferiorly to provide sympathetic supply to the abdomen. The nerves contain preganglionic sympathetic fibers and general visceral afferent fibers.

== Nerves ==
There are three main thoracic splanchnic nerves.

Name	Spinal Nerve Roots	Ganglia	Structure	Function
Greater splanchnic nerve	T5–T9	T5–T9 T5–T10	The greater splanchnic nerve travels through the diaphragm and enters the abdominal cavity. Its fibers synapse at the celiac ganglia. The nerve contributes to the celiac plexus, a network of nerves located in the vicinity of where the celiac trunk branches from the abdominal aorta.	The greater splanchnic nerve modulates the activity of the enteric nervous system of the foregut. It stimulates contraction of the splanchnic vasculature, increasing blood pressure. It also provides sympathetic innervation to the adrenal medulla, stimulating catecholamine release. It may provide sensory innervation to the pancreas.
Lesser splanchnic nerve	T9–T12	T9–T12 T9–T10 T10–T12 T10–T11	The lesser splanchnic nerve travels inferiorly, lateral to the greater splanchnic nerve. Its fibers synapse with their postganglionic counterparts in the superior mesenteric ganglion, or in the aorticorenal ganglion.	The lesser splanchnic nerve modulates the activity of the enteric nervous system of the midgut.
Least splanchnic nerve	T12	T12–L2 T11–T12	The least splanchnic nerve travels into the abdomen medial to the sympathetic trunk. Its fibers synapse in the renal plexus.	

== Additional images ==
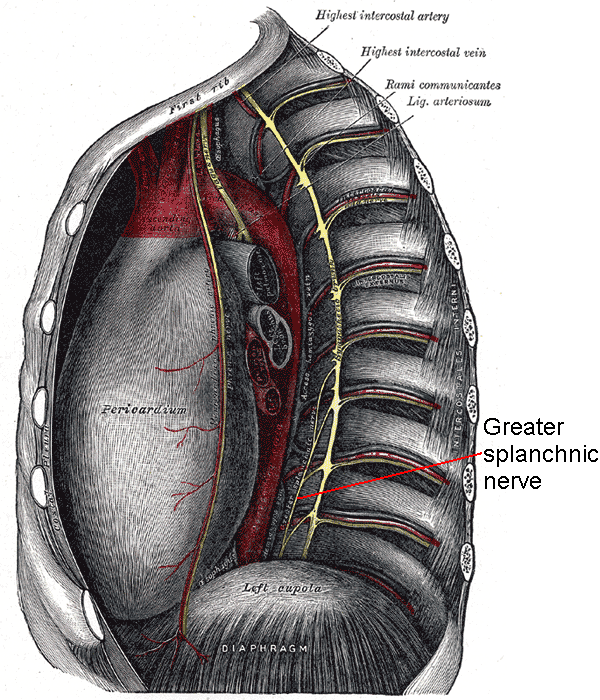
Greater splanchnic nerve, seen in thoracic cavity seen from left side.

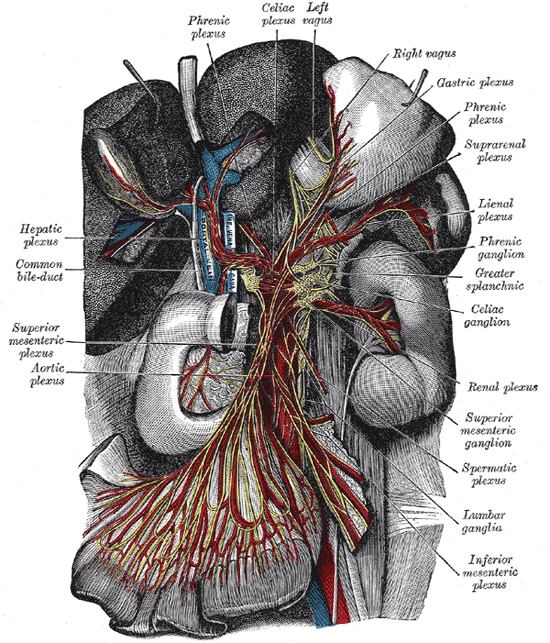
The celiac ganglia with the sympathetic plexuses of the abdominal viscera radiating from the ganglia.

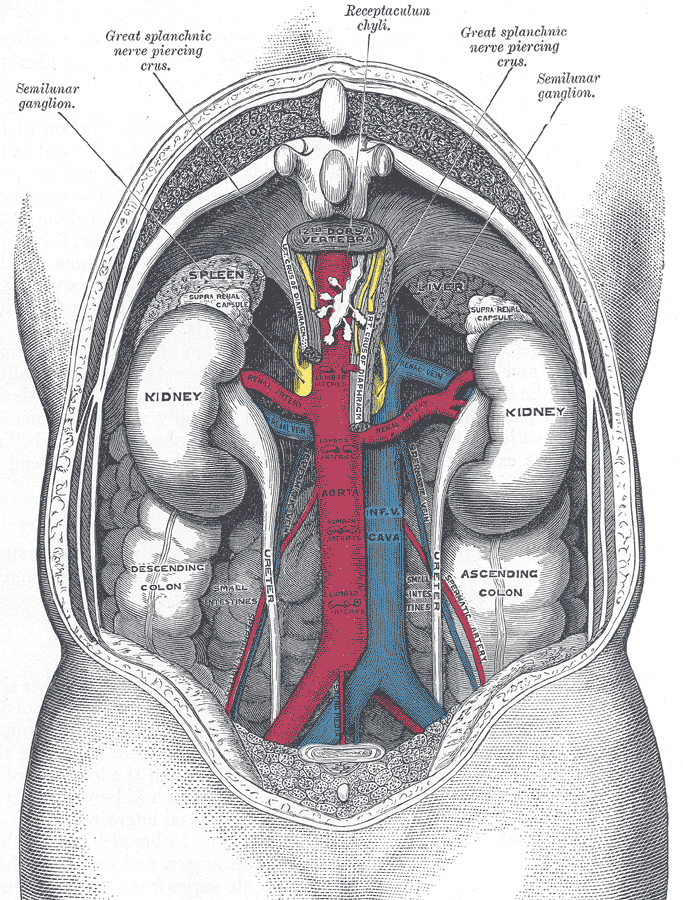
The relations of the viscera and large vessels of the abdomen. Seen from behind, the last thoracic vertebra being well raised.

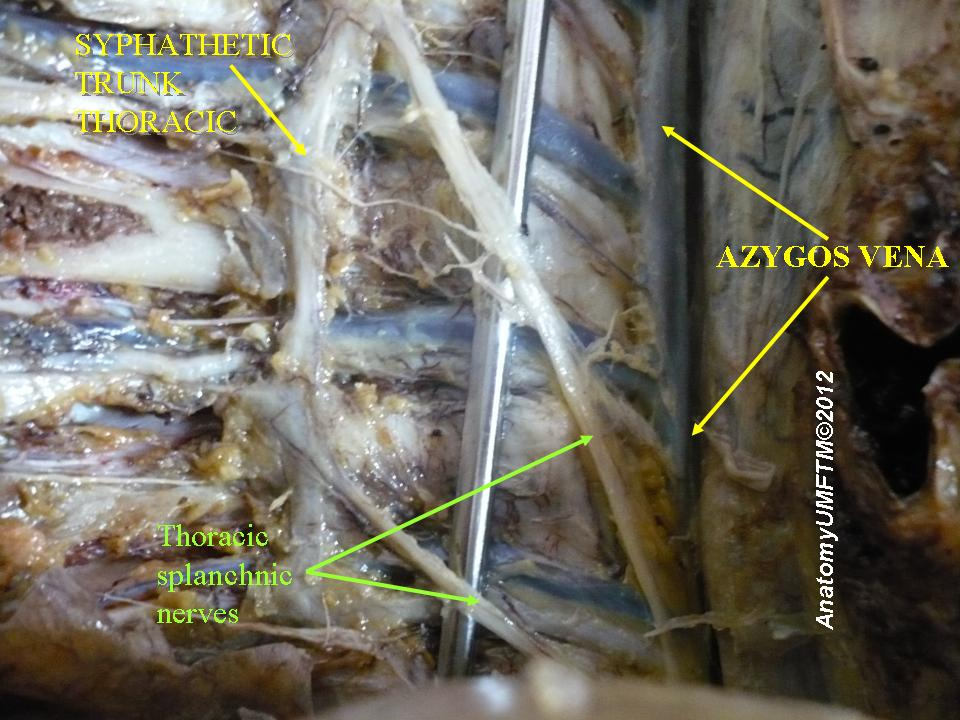
Thoracic splanchnic nerves
