= Esophageal plexus =

Nerve network of the esophagus

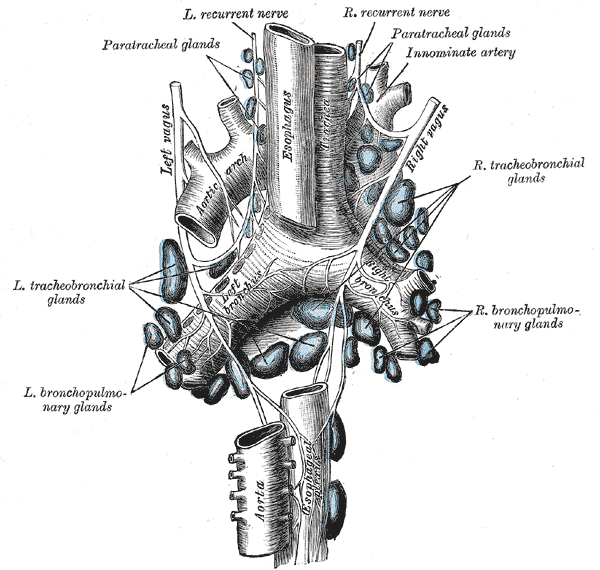
- The tracheobronchial lymph glands. (Esophageal plexus visible at bottom center.)

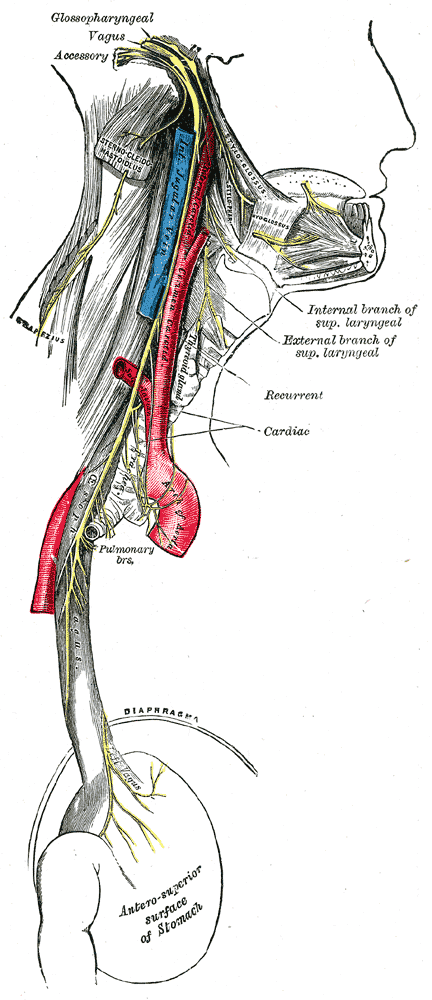
- Course and distribution of the glossopharyngeal, vagus, and accessory nerves.

Details
- From: Vagus nerve and sympathetic trunk
- To: Esophagus (same fibers make up the cardiac plexus)

Identifiers
- Latin: plexus oesophageus
- TA98: A14.2.01.173; A14.3.03.015
- TA2: 6690
- FMA: 6225

The esophageal plexus (oesophageal plexus in British English) is formed by nerve fibers from two sources, branches of the vagus nerve, and visceral branches of the sympathetic trunk. The esophageal plexus and the cardiac plexus contain the same types of fibers and are both considered thoracic autonomic plexus.

== Parasympathetic fibers ==
The vagus nerve delivers two fiber types to the esophageal plexus:

- Parasympathetic preganglionic fibers – These fibers have their cell bodies located in the dorsal motor nucleus of the vagus and they will synapse on the terminal ganglia in the walls of the esophagus.
- Afferent fibers – These fibers are primarily concerned with autonomic reflexes and they have their cell bodies in the inferior ganglion of the vagus.

These vagal fibers in the esophageal plexus reform to make the anterior vagal trunk (left vagus) and the posterior vagal trunk (right vagus). Anterior and posterior being terms in relation to the esophagus, a mnemonic for which is "LARP": Left becomes Anterior, Right becomes Posterior.

== Sympathetic fibers ==
The visceral branches of the sympathetic trunk also deliver two fiber types to the esophageal plexus:

- Sympathetic postganglionic fibers – The cell bodies of these fibers are located in the sympathetic chain ganglia. The cell bodies of the preganglionic fibers, the first neuron of this two neuron chain, are located in the intermediolateral cell column (IMLCC) of the thoracic spinal cord.
- Afferent fibers – These fibers are primarily concerned with pain and have cell bodies located in the dorsal root ganglion.

== Additional images ==
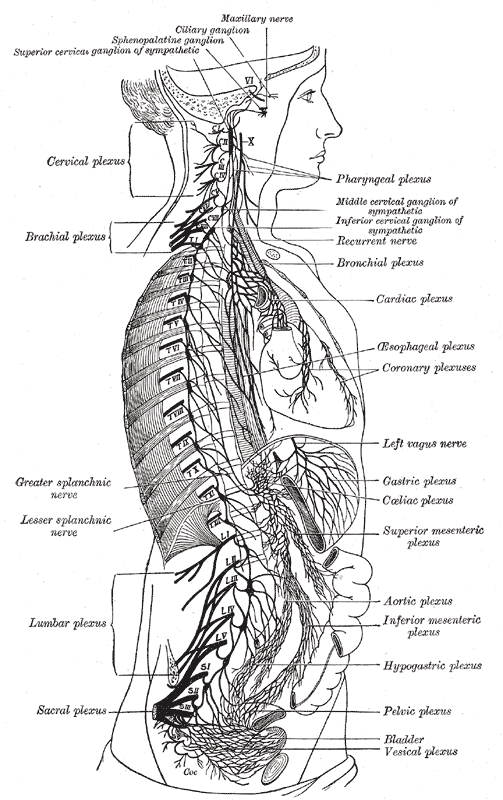
The right sympathetic chain and its connections with the thoracic, abdominal, and pelvic plexuses.

== See also ==
- Esophagus
- Cardiac plexus
- Thoracic autonomic plexus
