= Celiac plexus =

Complex network of nerves located in the upper abdomen

Solar plexus
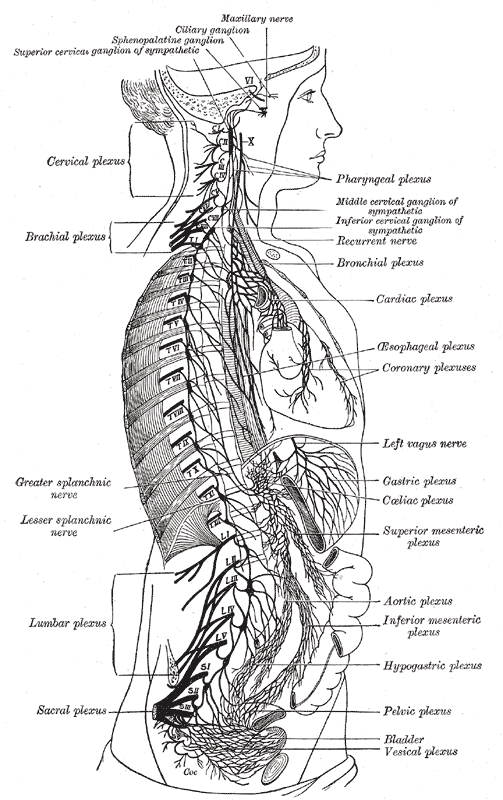
- The right sympathetic trunk and its connections with the thoracic, abdominal, and pelvic plexuses. (Celiac plexus (labelled as Cœliac plexus) at center right.)

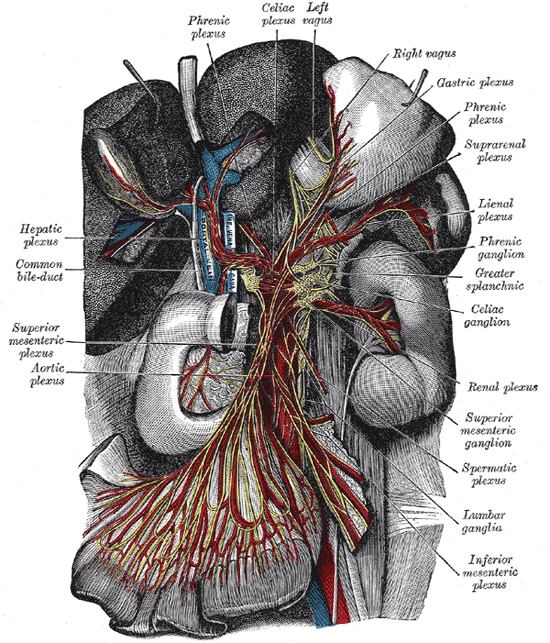
- The celiac ganglia with the sympathetic plexuses of the abdominal viscera radiating from the ganglia. (Label for celiac plexus at top center.)

Details
- From: Celiac branches of vagus nerve

Identifiers
- Latin: plexus coeliacus
- MeSH: D002447
- TA98: A14.3.03.021
- TA2: 6696
- FMA: 6630

The celiac plexus, also known as the solar plexus because of its radiating nerve fibers, is a complex network of nerves located in the abdomen, near where the celiac trunk, superior mesenteric artery, and renal arteries branch from the abdominal aorta. It is behind the stomach and the omental bursa, and in front of the crura of the diaphragm, on the level of the first lumbar vertebra.

The plexus is formed in part by the greater and lesser splanchnic nerves of both sides, and fibers from the anterior and posterior vagal trunks.

The celiac plexus proper consists of the celiac ganglia with a network of interconnecting fibers. The aorticorenal ganglia are often considered to be part of the celiac ganglia, and thus, part of the plexus.

== Structure ==
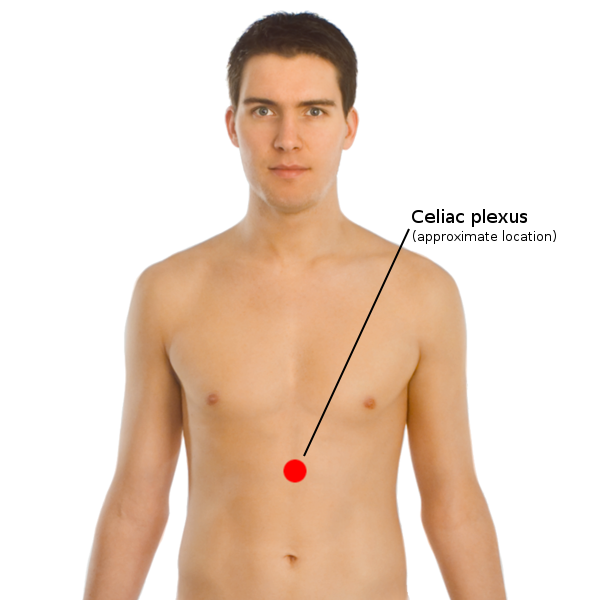
Approximate location of the celiac plexus on the coronal plane

The celiac plexus includes a number of smaller plexuses:

- Hepatic plexus
- Splenic plexus
- Gastric plexus
- Pancreatic plexus
- Suprarenal plexus

Other plexuses that are derived from the celiac plexus:

- Renal plexus
- Testicular plexus / ovarian plexus
- Superior mesenteric plexus

== Terminology ==
The celiac plexus is often popularly referred to as the "solar plexus". In the context of sparring or injury, a strike to the region of the stomach around the celiac plexus may cause the diaphragm to spasm, resulting in difficulty in breathing—a sensation commonly known as "getting the wind knocked out of you". It may also affect the celiac plexus itself, which can cause great pain and interfere with the functioning of the viscera.

== Clinical significance ==
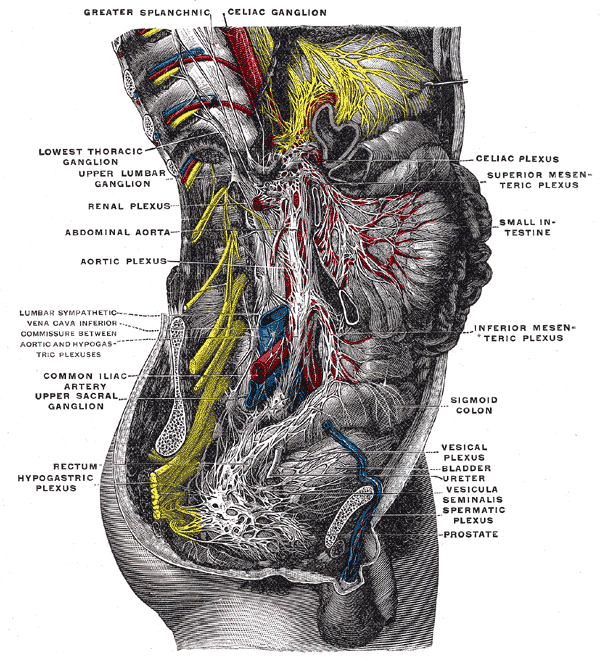
Lower half of right sympathetic cord

A blunt injury to the celiac plexus normally resolves with rest and deep breathing.

Intractable pain related to chronic pancreatitis may be an indication for celiac plexus ablation.

A celiac plexus block to treat intractable pain from cancers such as pancreatic cancer may be performed by pain management specialists and radiologists using a fluoroscopically or CT scan-guided injection.

== See also ==
- Cardiac plexus
- Celiac ganglia
- Superior hypogastric plexus
- Manipura
