= Gastro-omental artery =

Gastro-omental artery may refer to:

- Left gastro-omental artery
- Right gastro-omental artery
