= Renal plexus =

Nerve in the abdominal region

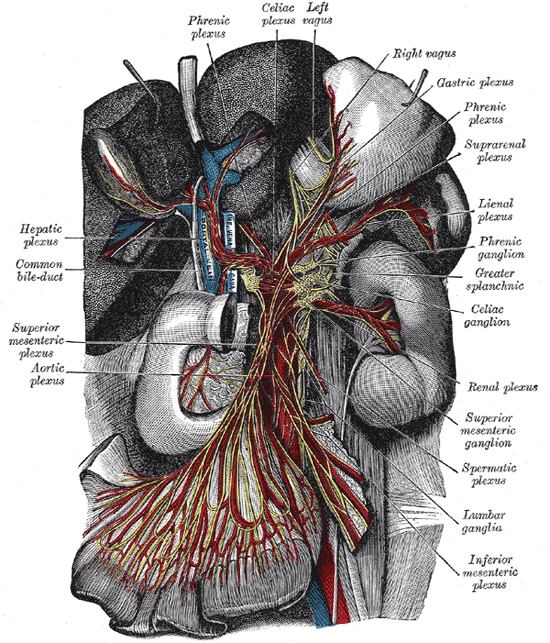
- The celiac ganglia with the sympathetic plexuses of the abdominal viscera radiating from the ganglia (renal plexus labeled at center right).

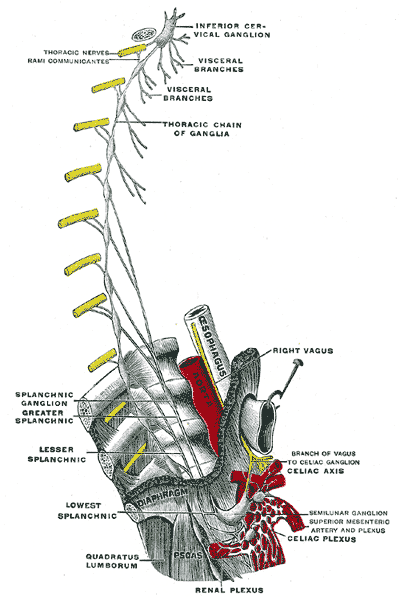
- Plan of right sympathetic trunk and splanchnic nerves (renal plexus labeled at bottom center).

Details
- To: Ovarian plexus

Identifiers
- Latin: plexus renalis
- TA98: A14.3.03.032
- TA2: 6702
- FMA: 6636

The renal plexus is a complex network of nerves formed by filaments from the celiac ganglia and plexus, aorticorenal ganglia, lower thoracic splanchnic nerves and first lumbar splanchnic nerve and aortic plexus.

The nerves from these sources, fifteen or twenty in number, have a few ganglia developed upon them.

It enters the kidneys on arterial branches to supply the vessels, renal glomerulus, and tubules with branches to the ureteric plexus. Some filaments are distributed to the spermatic plexus and, on the right side, to the inferior vena cava.

The ovarian plexus arises from the renal plexus, and is one of two sympathetic supplies distributed to the ovary and fundus of the uterus.

== Additional images ==
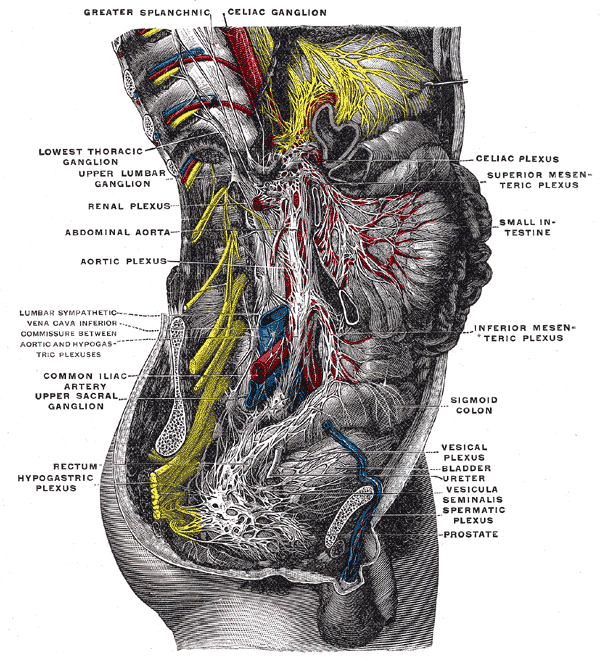
Lower half of right sympathetic cord.
