= Intermesenteric plexus =

Network of nerve fibers in the abdomen

Details

Identifiers
- Latin: plexus intermesentericus
- TA98: A14.3.03.031
- TA2: 6708
- FMA: 18049

The Intermesenteric plexus is a nerve plexus on the abdominal aorta, between the exits of the superior and inferior mesenteric artery.

The lumbar splanchnic nerves terminate here, among other places.
