= Superior rectal plexus =

Details

Identifiers
- Latin: plexus rectalis superior
- TA98: A14.3.03.038
- TA2: 6710
- FMA: 21536

The superior rectal plexus (or superior hemorrhoidal plexus) supplies the rectum and joins in the pelvis with branches from the pelvic plexuses.

The superior rectal plexus is a division of the inferior mesenteric plexus.
