= Spermatic plexus =

Plexus of nerves in the pelvis

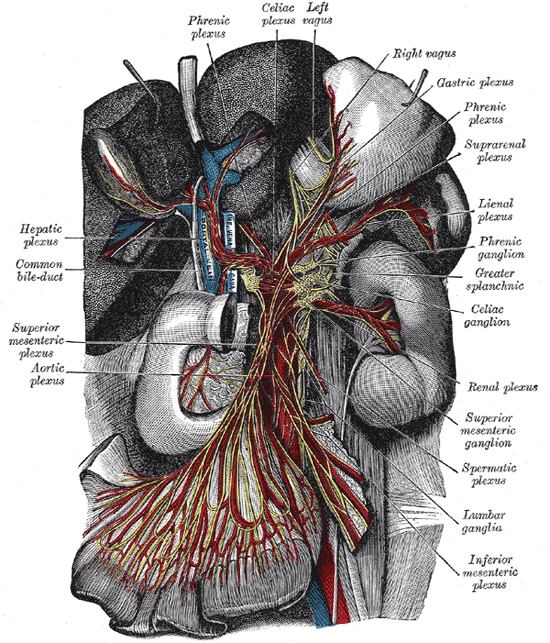
- The celiac ganglia with the sympathetic plexuses of the abdominal viscera radiating from the ganglia. (Spermatic plexus labeled at right, third from the bottom.)

Details
- From: renal plexus

Identifiers
- Latin: plexus testicularis, plexus spermaticus
- TA98: A14.3.03.035M
- TA2: 6707
- FMA: 6637

The spermatic plexus (or testicular plexus) is derived from the renal plexus, receiving branches from the aortic plexus. It accompanies the internal spermatic artery to the testis.

== Additional images ==
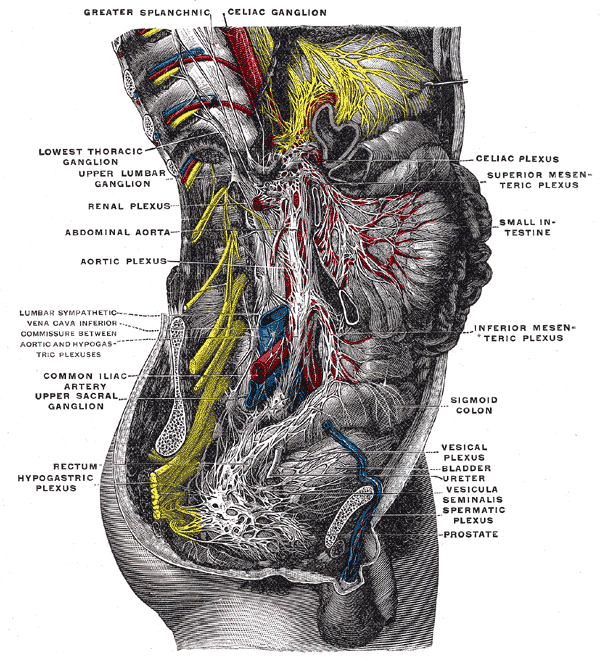
Lower half of right sympathetic cord.

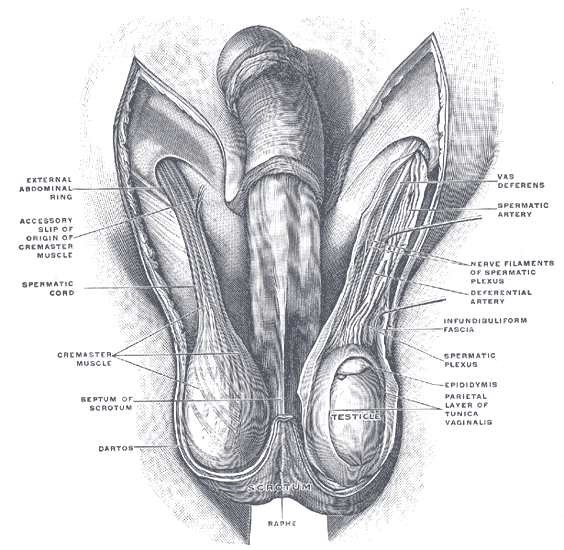
The scrotum.
