= Celiac branches of vagus nerve =

Details
- From: Anterior gastric branches of anterior vagal trunk, posterior gastric branches of posterior vagal trunk
- To: Celiac plexus

Identifiers
- Latin: rami coeliaci nervi vagi
- TA98: A14.2.01.182
- TA2: 6682
- FMA: 75518

The celiac (or coeliac) branches of vagus nerve are small branches which provide parasympathetic innervation to the celiac plexus. The celiac nerves receive sensory information from multiple gastrointestinal organs as well as from the spleen, kidneys and extrarenal glands. In turn, these nerves influence the activatation of smooth muscle and secretory cells in these organs.
