= Inferior mesenteric ganglion =

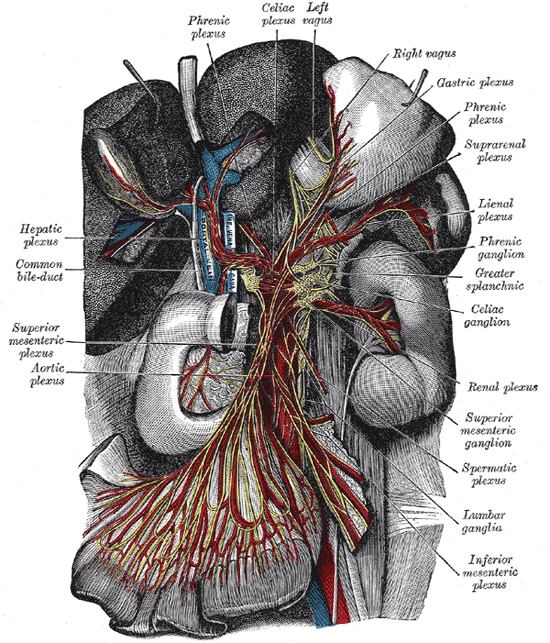
- The celiac ganglia with the sympathetic plexuses of the abdominal viscera radiating from the ganglia.

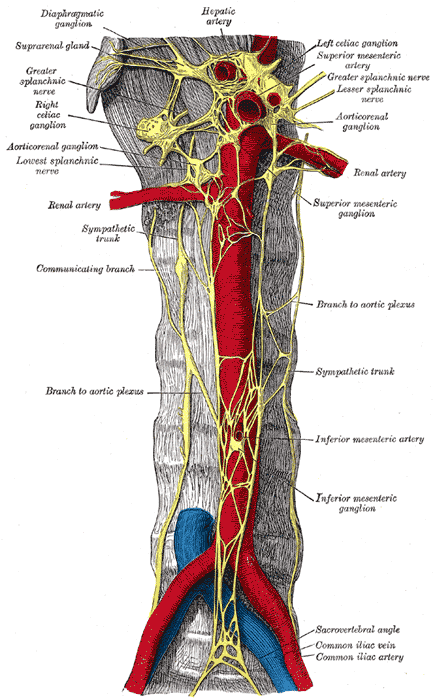
- Abdominal portion of the sympathetic trunk, with the celiac plexus and hypogastric plexus.

Details
- To: inferior mesenteric plexus

Identifiers
- Latin: ganglion mesentericum inferius
- TA98: A14.3.03.037
- TA2: 6642
- FMA: 77590

The inferior mesenteric ganglion is a ganglion located near where the inferior mesenteric artery branches from the abdominal aorta.

== Additional images ==
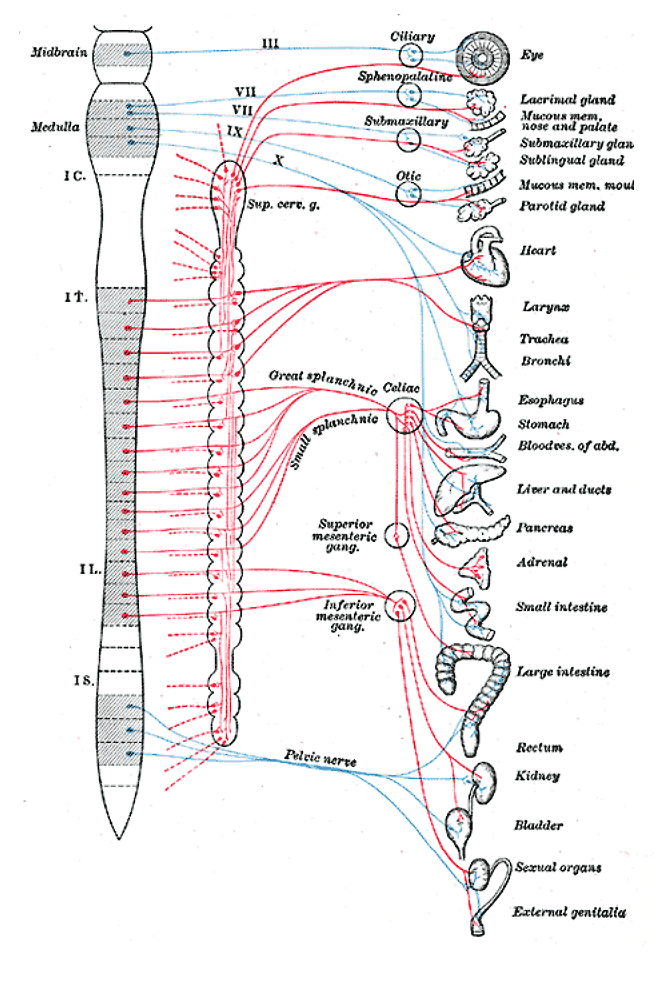
Sympathetic (red) and parasympathetic (blue) nervous system

== See also ==
- Superior mesenteric ganglion
