= Inferior mesenteric plexus =

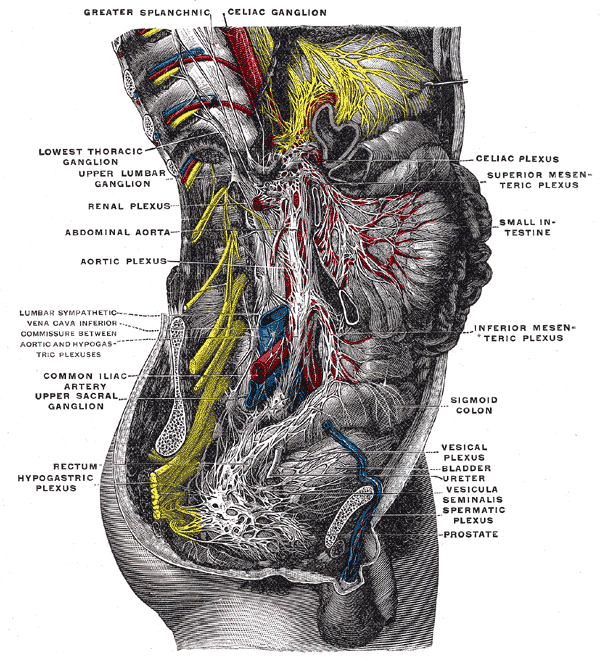
- Lower half of right sympathetic cord. (Inferior mesenteric plexus labeled at center right.)

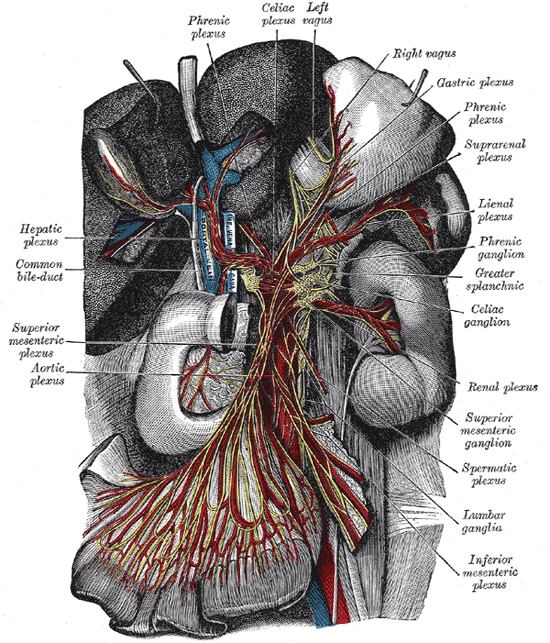
- The celiac ganglia with the sympathetic plexuses of the abdominal viscera radiating from the ganglia. (Inferior mesenteric plexus labeled at lower right.)

Details
- From: Aortic plexus

Identifiers
- Latin: plexus mesentericus inferior
- TA98: A14.3.03.036
- TA2: 6709
- FMA: 6641

The inferior mesenteric plexus is derived chiefly from the aortic plexus.

It surrounds the inferior mesenteric artery, and divides into a number of secondary plexuses, which are distributed to all the parts supplied by the artery, viz., the left colic and sigmoid plexuses, which supply the descending and sigmoid parts of the colon; and the superior hemorrhoidal plexus, which supplies the rectum and joins in the pelvis with branches from the pelvic plexuses.

== Additional images ==
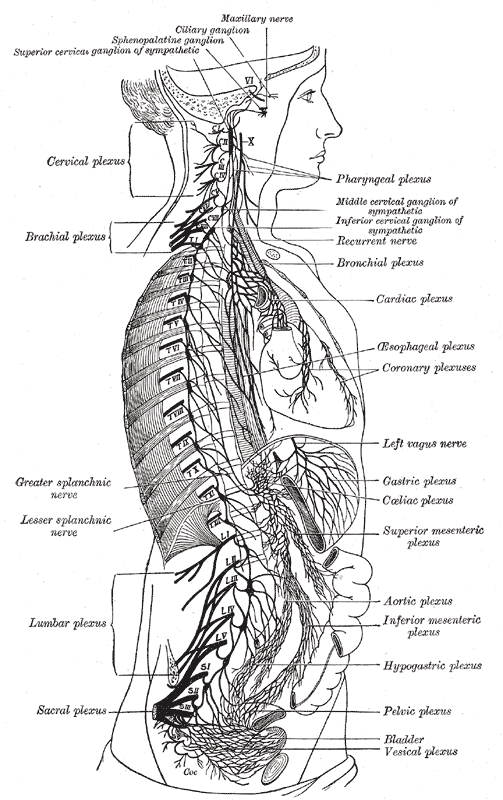
The right sympathetic chain and its connections with the thoracic, abdominal, and pelvic plexuses.

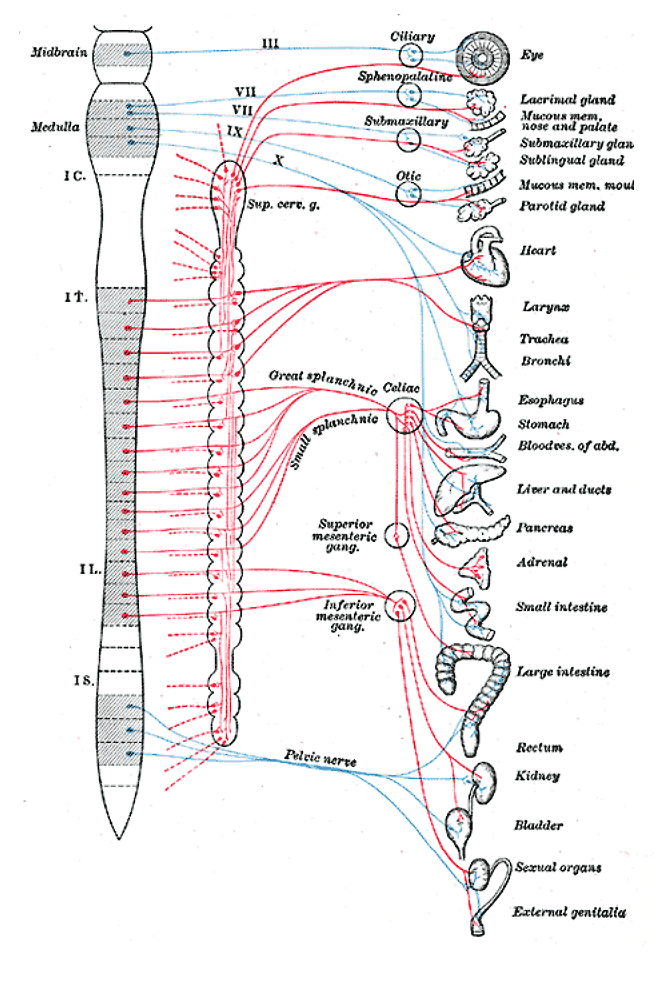
Diagram of efferent sympathetic nervous system.

== See also ==
- Inferior mesenteric artery
- Superior mesenteric plexus
