= Ovarian plexus =

Details
- From: Renal plexus

Identifiers
- Latin: plexus ovaricus
- TA98: A14.3.03.035F
- TA2: 6706
- FMA: 6638

The ovarian plexus arises from the renal plexus, and is distributed to the ovary, and fundus of the uterus.

It is carried in the suspensory ligament of the ovary.
