= Posterior vagal trunk =

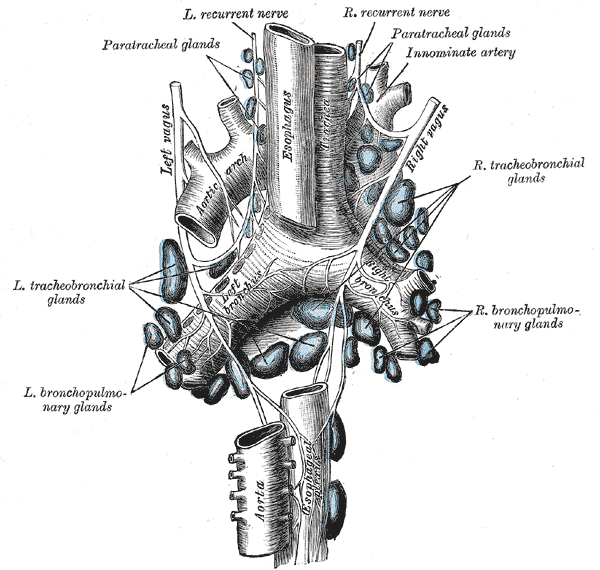
- The tracheobronchial lymph glands.

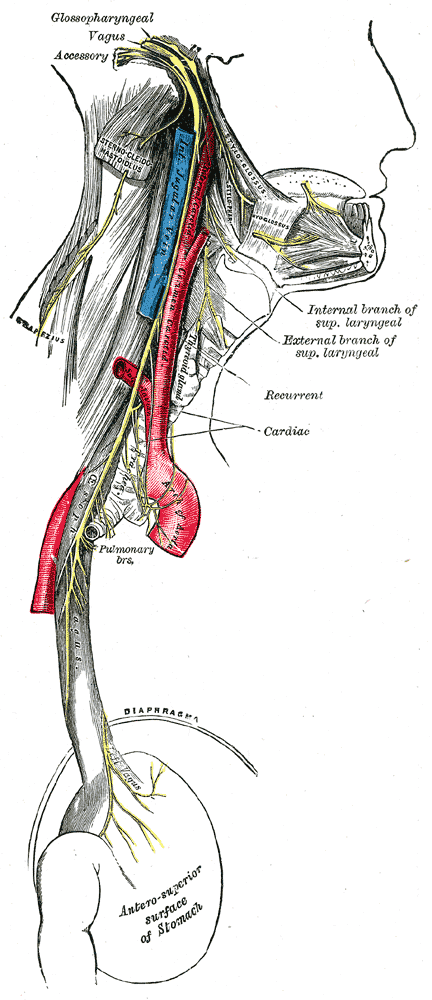
- Course and distribution of the glossopharyngeal, vagus, and accessory nerves.

Details

Identifiers
- Latin: truncus vagalis posterior
- TA98: A14.2.01.179
- TA2: 6679
- FMA: 6227

The posterior vagal trunk is one of the two divisions (the other being the anterior vagal trunk) into which the vagus nerve splits as it passes through the esophageal hiatus to enter the abdominal cavity. The anterior and posterior vagal trunks together represent the inferior continuation of the esophageal nervous plexus inferior to the diaphragm.

== Anatomy ==
=== Branches ===
- Celiac branch
- Posterior gastric branches of posterior vagal trunk|Posterior gastric branches
