= Thoracic aortic plexus =

Network of nerves in the thorax

Details

Identifiers
- Latin: plexus aorticus thoracicus
- TA98: A14.3.03.012
- TA2: 6658
- FMA: 77574

The thoracic aortic plexus is a sympathetic plexus in the region of the thoracic aorta.
