= Superior mesenteric plexus =

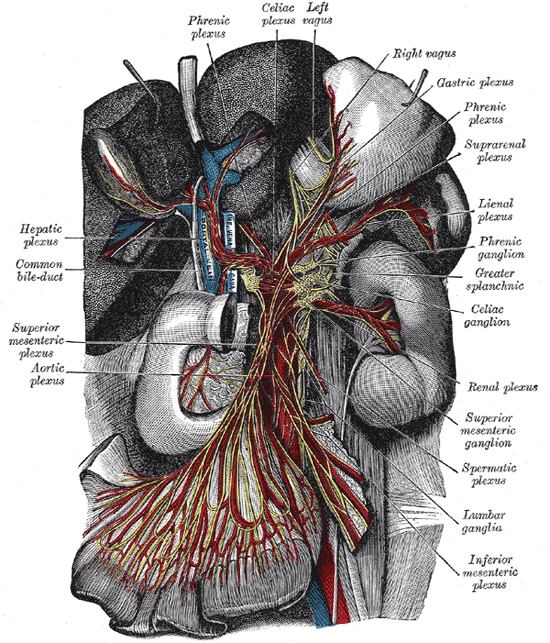
- The celiac ganglia with the sympathetic plexuses of the abdominal viscera radiating from the ganglia.

Details
- From: Celiac plexus

Identifiers
- Latin: plexus mesentericus superior
- TA98: A14.3.03.029
- TA2: 6705
- FMA: 6639

The superior mesenteric plexus is a continuation of the lower part of the celiac plexus, receiving a branch from the junction of the right vagus nerve with the plexus.

It surrounds the superior mesenteric artery, accompanies it into the mesentery, and divides into a number of secondary plexuses, which are distributed to all the parts supplied by the artery, viz., pancreatic branches to the pancreas; intestinal branches to the small intestine; and ileocolic, right colic, and middle colic branches, which supply the corresponding parts of the great intestine.

The nerves composing this plexus are white in color and firm in texture; in the upper part of the plexus close to the origin of the superior mesenteric artery is the superior mesenteric ganglion.

== Additional images ==
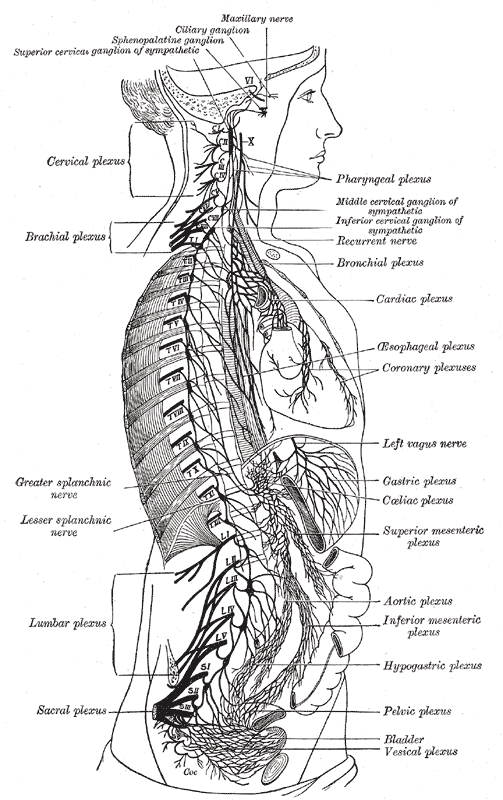
The right sympathetic chain and its connections with the thoracic, abdominal, and pelvic plexuses.

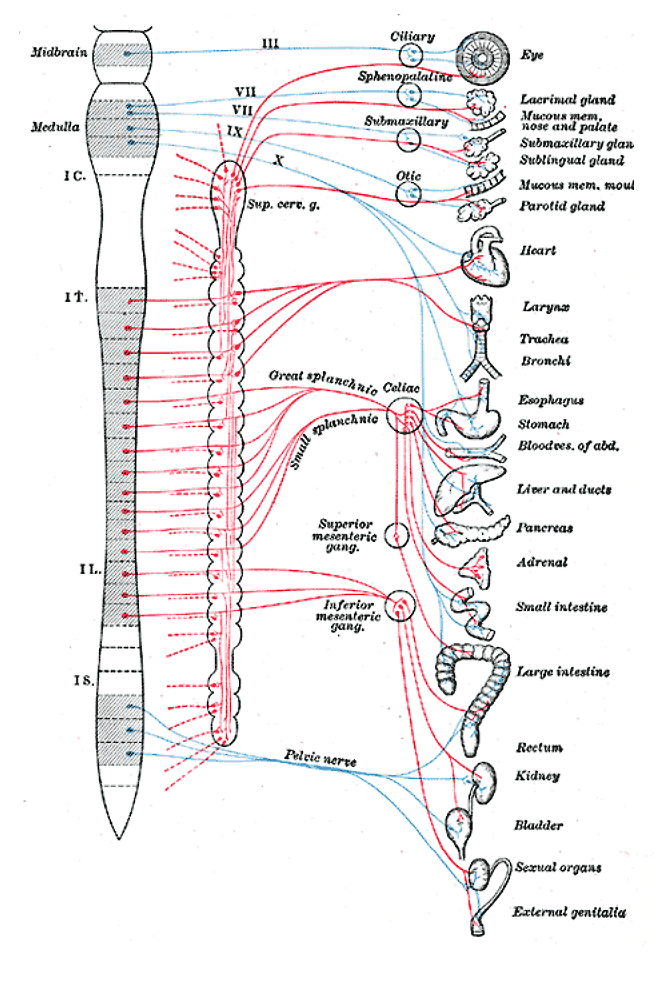
Diagram of efferent sympathetic nervous system.

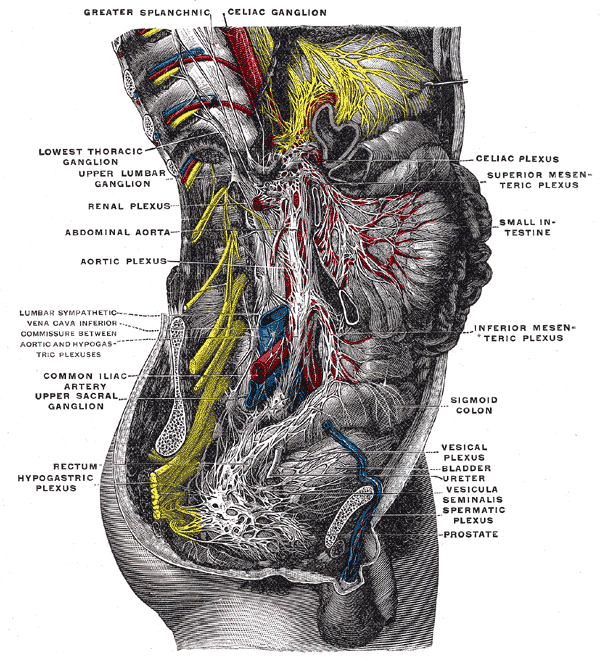
Lower half of right sympathetic cord.

== See also ==
- Inferior mesenteric plexus
