= Superior mesenteric ganglion =

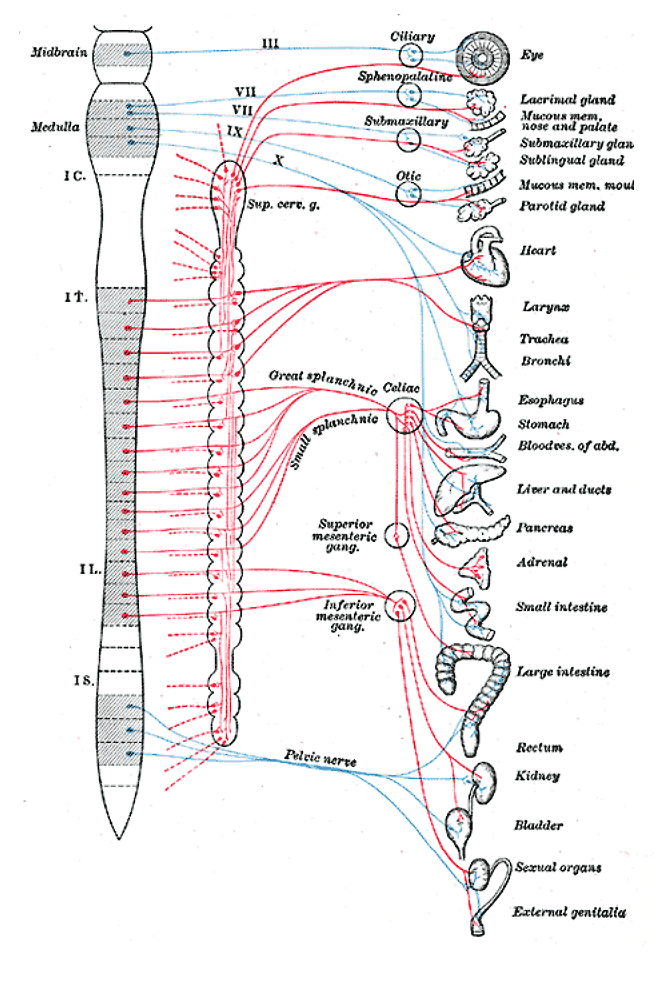
- Sympathetic (red) and parasympathetic (blue) nervous system

Details
- To: superior mesenteric plexus

Identifiers
- Latin: ganglion mesentericum superius
- TA98: A14.3.03.030
- TA2: 6641
- FMA: 77589

The superior mesenteric ganglion is a ganglion in the upper part of the superior mesenteric plexus. It lies close to the origin of the superior mesenteric artery.

== Structure ==
The superior mesenteric ganglion is the synapsing point for one of the pre- and post-synaptic nerves of the sympathetic division of the autonomic nervous system. Specifically, contributions to the superior mesenteric ganglion arise from the lesser splanchnic nerve, which typically arises from the spinal nerve roots of T10 and T11. This nerve goes on to innervate the jejunum, the ileum, the ascending colon and the transverse colon. While the sympathetic input of the midgut is innervated by the sympathetic nerves of the thorax, parasympathetic innervation is done by the vagus nerve, which travels along the plexuses that arise from the anterior and posterior vagal trunks of the stomach.
