= Celiac ganglia =

Two large masses of nerve tissue in the upper abdomen

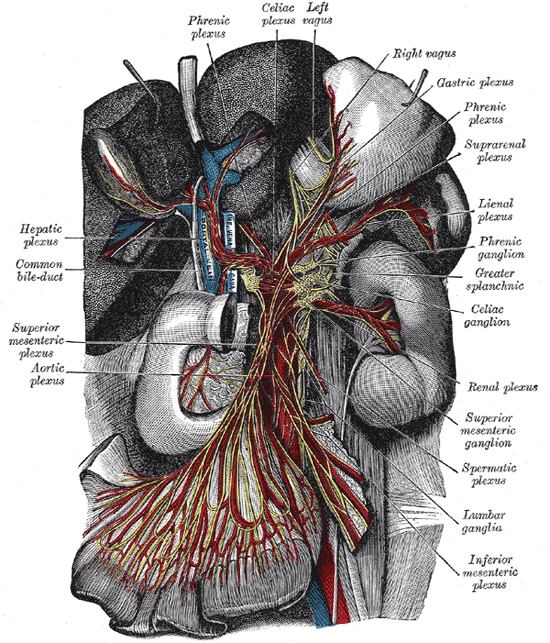
- The celiac ganglia with the sympathetic plexuses of the abdominal viscera radiating from the ganglia. (Celiac ganglion labeled at center right.)

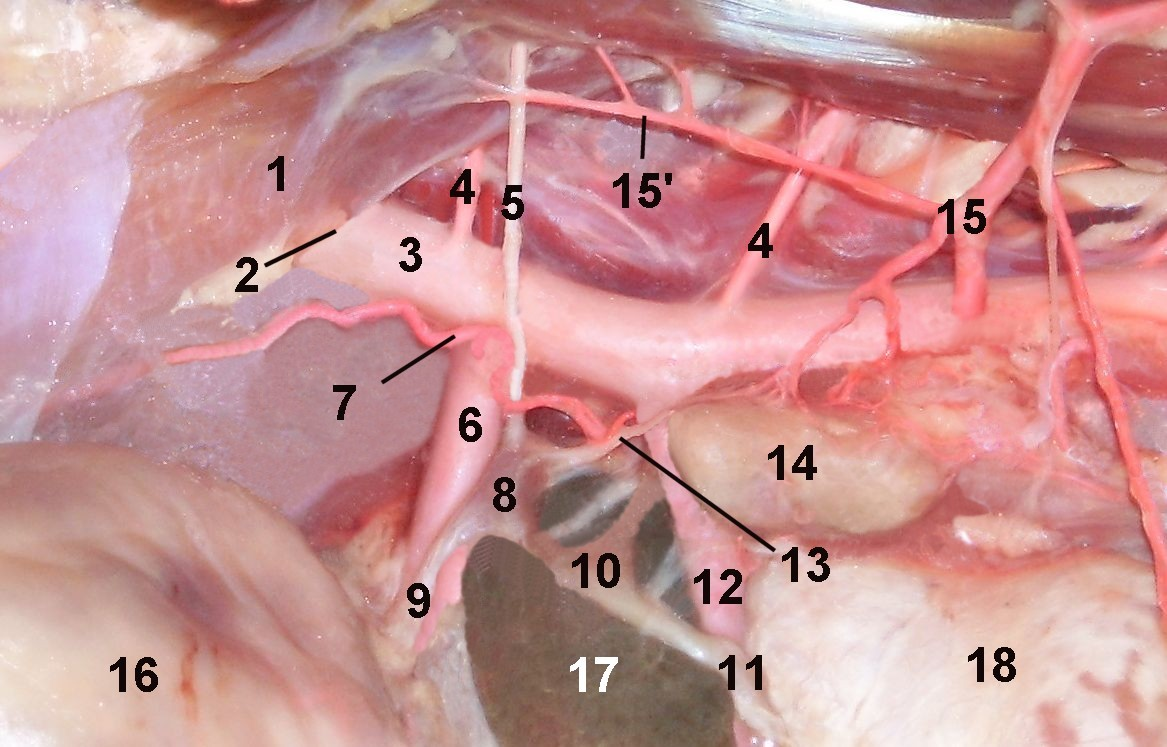
- Celiac and cranial mesenteric ganglion . 1 Crus sinistrum (Diaphragma), 2 hiatus aorticus, 3 Aorta, 4 Arteria lumbalis, 5 Nervus splanchnicus major, 6 Arteria coeliaca, 7 Arteria phrenica caudalis, 8 Celiac ganglion, 9 Plexus coeliacus, 10 Inferior mesenteric ganglia, 11 superior mesenteric plexus, 12 Superior mesenteric artery, 13 Nervus splanchnicus minor, 14 Adrenal gland, 15 Arteria abdominalis cranialis, 16 Stomach, 17 Liver (Lobus caudatus), 18 Kidney

Details
- From: Thoracic splanchnic nerves

Identifiers
- Latin: ganglia coeliaca
- TA98: A14.3.03.027
- TA2: 6639
- FMA: 77570 77584, 77570

The celiac ganglia or coeliac ganglia are two large irregularly shaped masses of nerve tissue in the upper abdomen. Part of the sympathetic subdivision of the autonomic nervous system (ANS), the two celiac ganglia are the largest ganglia in the ANS, and they innervate most of the digestive tract.

They have the appearance of lymph glands and are placed on either side of the midline in front of the crura of the diaphragm, close to the adrenal glands. The ganglion on the right side is placed behind the inferior vena cava.

They are sometimes referred to as the semilunar ganglia or the solar ganglia.

== Neurotransmission ==
The celiac ganglion is part of the sympathetic prevertebral chain possessing a great variety of specific receptors and neurotransmitters such as catecholamines, neuropeptides, and nitric oxide and constitutes a modulation center in the pathway of the afferent and efferent fibers between the central nervous system and the ovary.

The main preganglion neurotransmitter of the celiac ganglion is acetylcholine, yet the celiac ganglion-mesenteric complex also contain α and β adrenergic receptors and is innervated by fibers of adrenergic nature that come from other preaortic ganglia.

== Path ==
The upper part of each ganglion is joined by the greater splanchnic nerve, while the lower part, which is segmented off and named the aorticorenal ganglion, receives the lesser splanchnic nerve and gives off the greater part of the renal plexus.

== Innervation ==
These ganglia contain neurons whose postganglionic axons innervate the distal esophagus, stomach, proximal duodenum, liver, gallbladder, spleen, kidney, and the small intestine. They directly innervate the ovarian theca and secondary interstitial cells and exert an indirect action on the luteal cells.

== Links to ovary ==
Modifications in the adrenergic activity of the celiac ganglion results in an altered capacity of the ovary of pregnant rats to produce progesterone, suggesting that the celiac ganglion-superior ovarian nerve-ovarian axis provides a direct link between the autonomic nervous system and the physiology of pregnancy. It has also been shown that modifications in the cholinergic input at the celiac ganglion also led, via the superior ovarian nerve, to modifications in ovarian steroidogenesis. Most of the fibers of the superior ovarian nerve come from the postganglionic sympathetic neurons of the celiac ganglion.

== Additional images ==
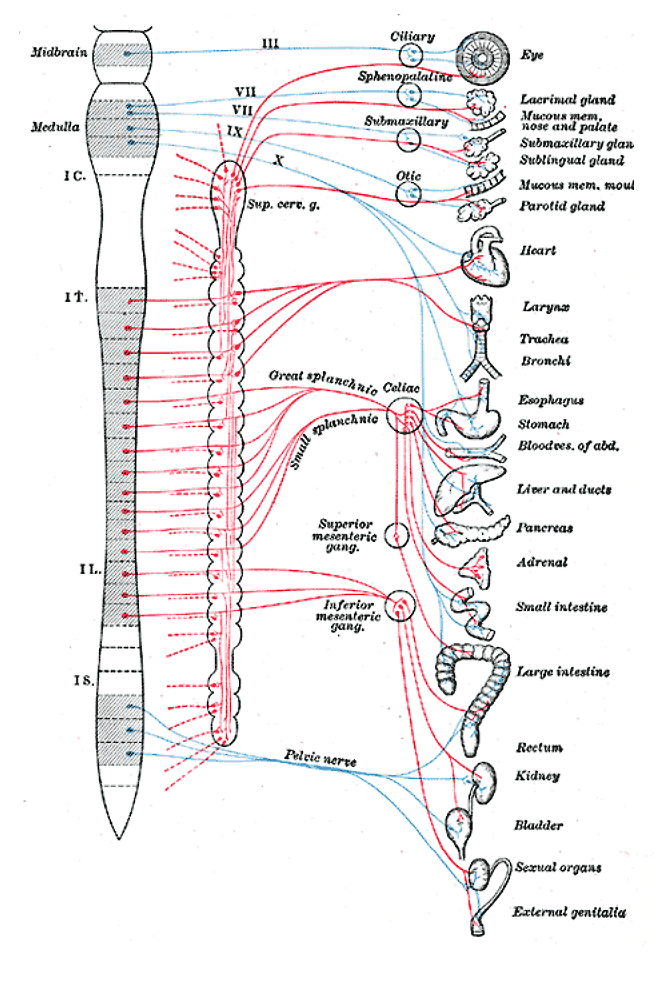
Diagram of efferent sympathetic nervous system.

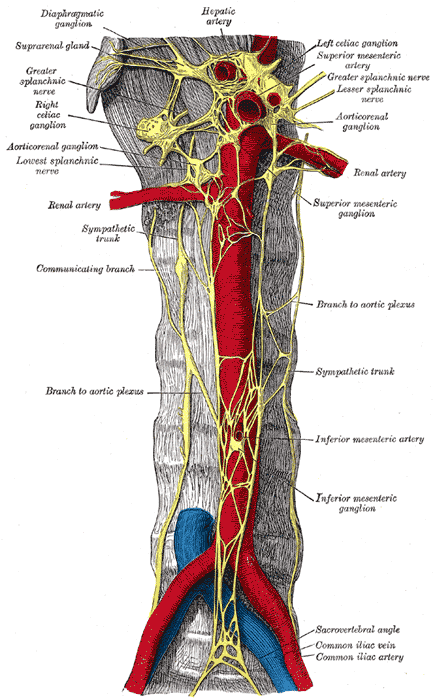
Abdominal portion of the sympathetic trunk, with the celiac and hypogastric plexuses.

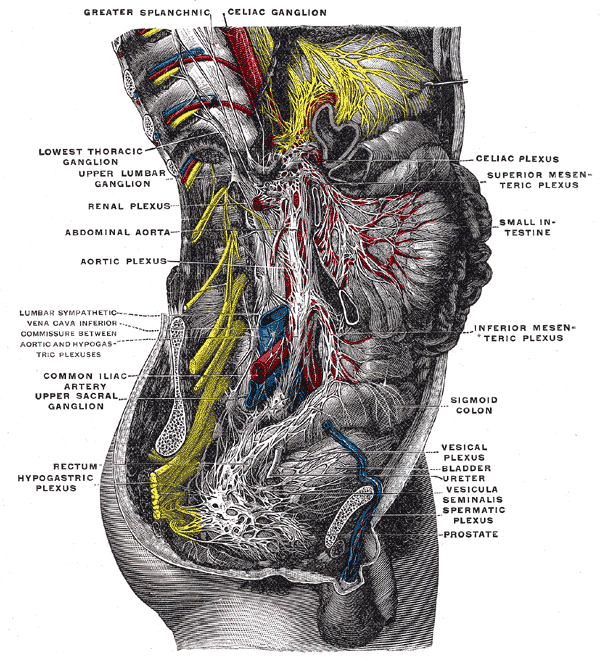
Lower half of right sympathetic cord.

== See also ==
- Celiac plexus
