= Intrapulmonary nodes =

Details

Identifiers
- Latin: nodi lymphoidei intrapulmonales

The Intrapulmonary nodes or Lymphatic Vessels of the Lungs originate in two plexuses, a superficial and a deep. The superficial plexus is placed beneath the pulmonary pleura. The deep accompanies the branches of the pulmonary vessels and the ramifications of the bronchi. In the case of the larger bronchi the deep plexus consists of two networks—one, submucous, beneath the mucous membrane, and another, peribronchial, outside the walls of the bronchi. In the smaller bronchi there is but a single plexus, which extends as far as the bronchioles, but fails to reach the alveoli, in the walls of which there are no traces of lymphatic vessels. The superficial efferents turn around the borders of the lungs and the margins of their fissures, and converge to end in some glands situated at the hilus; the deep efferents are conducted to the hilus along the pulmonary vessels and bronchi, and end in the tracheobronchial lymph nodes. Little or no anastomosis occurs between the superficial and deep lymphatics of the lungs, except in the region of the hilus. they are located in right fissure of lung near the heart
