= Rami bronchiales =

Rami bronchiales or bronchial branches can refer to:

- Bronchial artery (rami bronchiales partis thoracicae aortae) (Arteriae bronchiales)
- Pulmonary branches of vagus nerve (rami bronchiales nervi vagi)
