= Mucinous cystadenocarcinoma of the lung =

- Other names: Mucinous multilocular cyst carcinoma, Pseudomyxomatous pulmonary adenocarcinoma, Mucinous cystic tumor of low malignant potential
- Specialty: Oncology

Mucinous cystadenocarcinoma of the lung (MCACL) is a very rare malignant mucus-producing neoplasm arising from the uncontrolled growth of transformed epithelial cells originating in lung tissue.

== Classification ==
According to the most recent revision (2004) of the World Health Organization (WHO) histological classification system for lung tumors ("WHO2004"), currently the most widely recognized typing scheme for pulmonary neoplasia, MCACL is considered a distinctive variant of adenocarcinoma.

Informally, some experts have included these tumors as a distinct variant among a spectrum of mucus-producing adenocarcinomas, including — in order of increasing relative extent of cellular mucus production and extracellular mucus accumulation — solid adenocarcinoma, mucoepidermoid carcinoma, mucinous bronchioloalveolar carcinoma, signet ring cell adenocarcinoma, mucinous cystadenocarcinoma, and mucinous "colloid" adenocarcinoma.

== Histogenesis ==
MCACL has been noted in most cases to show areas of gradual transition wherein cells become more atypical and feature more pronounced characteristics of malignancy as one proceeds from the capsule, or outermost layers of the tumor, toward the center of the mass. Some experts suggest that this tumor often develops after a slow progression from a relatively benign to a frankly malignant phenotype over a period of years to decades.

The putative cell of origin of this tumor is unknown. Electron microscopic studies in 3 cases described intracytoplasmic mucin, convoluted oval nuclei, prominent nucleoli, homogeneous euchromatin with peripheral chromatin condensation, microvilli, junctional complexes, and primitive lumen formation. Their failure to identify lamellar bodies and large dense granules seemed to rule out origination from either Club cells or Type II pneumocytes.

In a review of 66 cystic pulmonary mucinous lesions, Gao and colleagues reported that p53 expression and a Ki-67 index exceeding 20% is characteristic of MCACL.

== Diagnosis ==
This particular variant of lung cancer is usually asymptomatic and is found after chest x-rays are taken for other reasons. Hemoptysis is seen occasionally and, in some cases, distal obstruction of bronchi by blood clots or mucus plugs produces cough and/or infection. Lesions often enlarge and progress slowly, over many years.

The 1999 World Health Organization classification system defined MCACL as a cystic adenocarcinoma with copious mucin production that, histologically, resembles (the more common) mucus-producing cystadenocarcinomas originating in the ovary, breast and pancreas. The 2004 revision of the WHO classification noted that the tumors tend to be well circumscribed by a partial fibrous tissue capsule with central cystic change and copious mucin pooling. The thin, fibrous wall circumscribing the tumor is highly characteristic of this lesion. It can sometimes occur within a pulmonary bronchocele, and this tumor entity should be kept in mind after identification of a bronchocele with suspicious or non-prototypical imaging characteristics.

Microscopically, the neoplastic epithelial cells tend to grow along the alveolar walls, in a fashion similar to the mucinous variant of bronchioloalveolar carcinoma, a more common form of adenocarcinoma.

Hemoptysis is seen occasionally.

Positron Emission Tomography (PET) scanning can be of assistance in diagnosing MCACL, as these lesions show intense uptake, typically in the wall of the tumor.

CA 19-9 has been reported to be elevated in MCACL.

Differential diagnosis of MCACL includes secondary metastatic cystadenocarcinomatous lesions, particularly from the pancreas or ovary, mucoepidermoid carcinoma, and pulmonary mucinous bronchioloalveolar carcinoma. The mouse monoclonal antibody 1D3, developed to detect a high molecular weight mucin found in a number of cystic malignancies of various organs, may be of use in differentiating primary mucinous cystadenocarcinoma of the lung from metastatic lung tumors due to mucinous cystic lesions of the uterus and pancreas, as well as those primary in the colon and stomach.

== Treatment ==
For treatment purposes, MCACL has been traditionally considered a non-small cell lung carcinoma (NSCLC). Complete radical surgical resection is the treatment of choice.

There is virtually no data regarding new molecular targets or targeted therapy in the literature to date. Iwasaki and co-workers failed to find mutations of the epidermal growth factor receptor (EGFR) or the cellular Kirsten rat sarcoma virus oncogene K-ras in one reported case.

== Prognosis ==
MCACL has a much more favorable prognosis than most other forms of adenocarcinoma and most other NSCLC's. Cases have been documented of continued growth of these lesions over a period of 10 years without symptoms or metastasis. The overall mortality rate appears to be somewhere in the vicinity of 18% to 27%, depending on the criteria that are used to define this entity.

== Incidence ==
Accurate incidence statistics on MCACL are unavailable. It is a very rare tumor, with only a few dozen cases reported in the literature to date.

In the few cases described in the literature to date, the male-to-female ratio is approximately unity, and right lung lesions occurred twice as commonly as left lung lesions. Approximately 2/3 of cases have been associated with tobacco smoking. Cases have been reported in patients as young as 29.
