= Root of the lung =

Anatomical structure

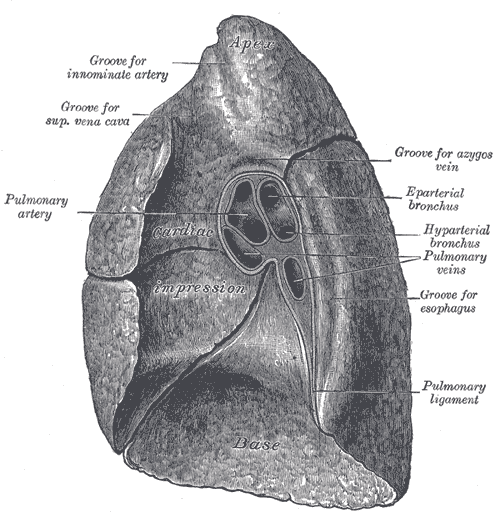
- Mediastinal surface of right lung.

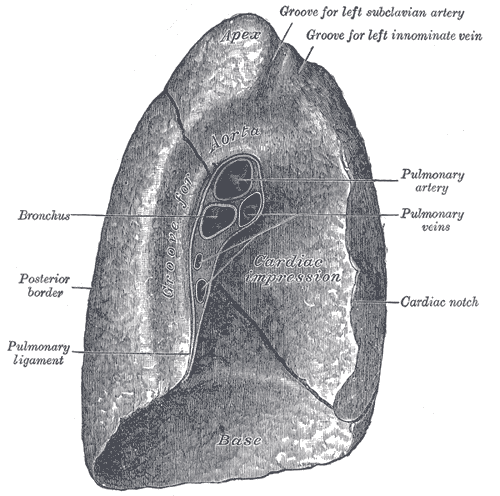
- Mediastinal surface of left lung.

Details

Identifiers
- Latin: radix pulmonis
- TA98: A06.5.01.016
- TA2: 3278
- FMA: 268155

The root of the lung is a group of structures that emerge at the hilum of each lung, just above the middle of the mediastinal surface and behind the cardiac impression of the lung. It is nearer to the back (posterior border) than the front (anterior border). The root of the lung is connected by the structures that form it to the heart and the trachea. The rib cage is separated from the lung by a two-layered membranous coating, the pleura. The hilum is the large triangular depression where the connection between the parietal pleura (covering the rib cage) and the visceral pleura (covering the lung) is made, and this marks the meeting point between the mediastinum and the pleural cavities.

== Location ==
The root of the right lung lies behind the superior vena cava and part of the right atrium, and below the azygos vein. That of the left lung passes beneath the aortic arch and in front of the descending aorta; the phrenic nerve, pericardiacophrenic artery and vein, and the anterior pulmonary plexus, lie in front of each, and the vagus nerve and posterior pulmonary plexus lie behind.

== Structures ==
=== Neurovascular ===
The root is formed by the bronchus, the pulmonary artery, the pulmonary veins, the bronchial arteries and veins, the pulmonary plexuses of nerves, lymphatic vessels, bronchial lymph nodes, and areolar tissue, all of which are enclosed by a reflection of the pleura. The chief structures composing the root of each lung are arranged in a similar manner from the front to the back on each side. This means that the upper of the two pulmonary veins are located anteriorly, the pulmonary artery is in the middle, and the bronchus and bronchial vessels are located posteriorly. The arrangement on the two sides is not symmetrical.

Right side: (superior to inferior) eparterial bronchus, pulmonary artery, hyparterial bronchus, and inferior pulmonary vein.

Left side: (superior to inferior) pulmonary artery, main bronchus, and inferior pulmonary vein.

=== Lymphatic ===
On each hilum, there are hilar bronchopulmonary lymph nodes.

=== Pulmonary ligament ===
The visceral-parietal reflection surrounding the root of the lung extends downwards from the hilum to near the base of the lower lobe in a sleeve-like fold called the pulmonary ligament. The lower rounded edge of this is sometimes referred to as the inferior pulmonary ligament. At the lower edge of each lung, the pleural layers come into contact with each other, and terminate in a free curved edge. The pulmonary ligaments serve to anchor the larger lower lobes of the lungs in position and prevent potential torsion.

== Clinical significance ==
On chest X-ray, hilar enlargement can be due to lymphadenopathy and tumours (tuberculosis, bronchogenic carcinoma, lymphoma, and sarcoidosis), pulmonary hypertension or simply due to increased lung blood flow.

== Additional images ==
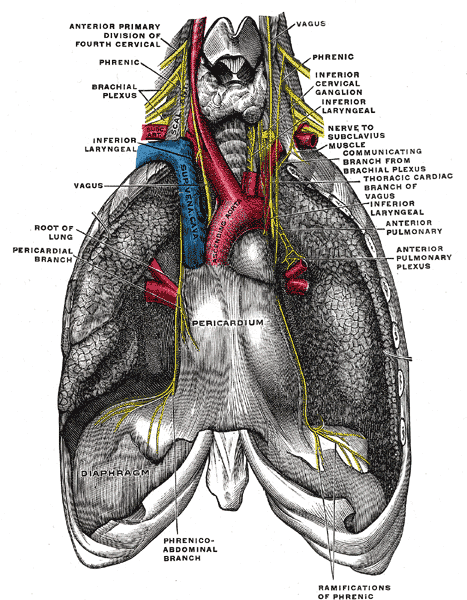
The phrenic nerve and its relations with the vagus nerve.
