= Lung cancer in Australia =

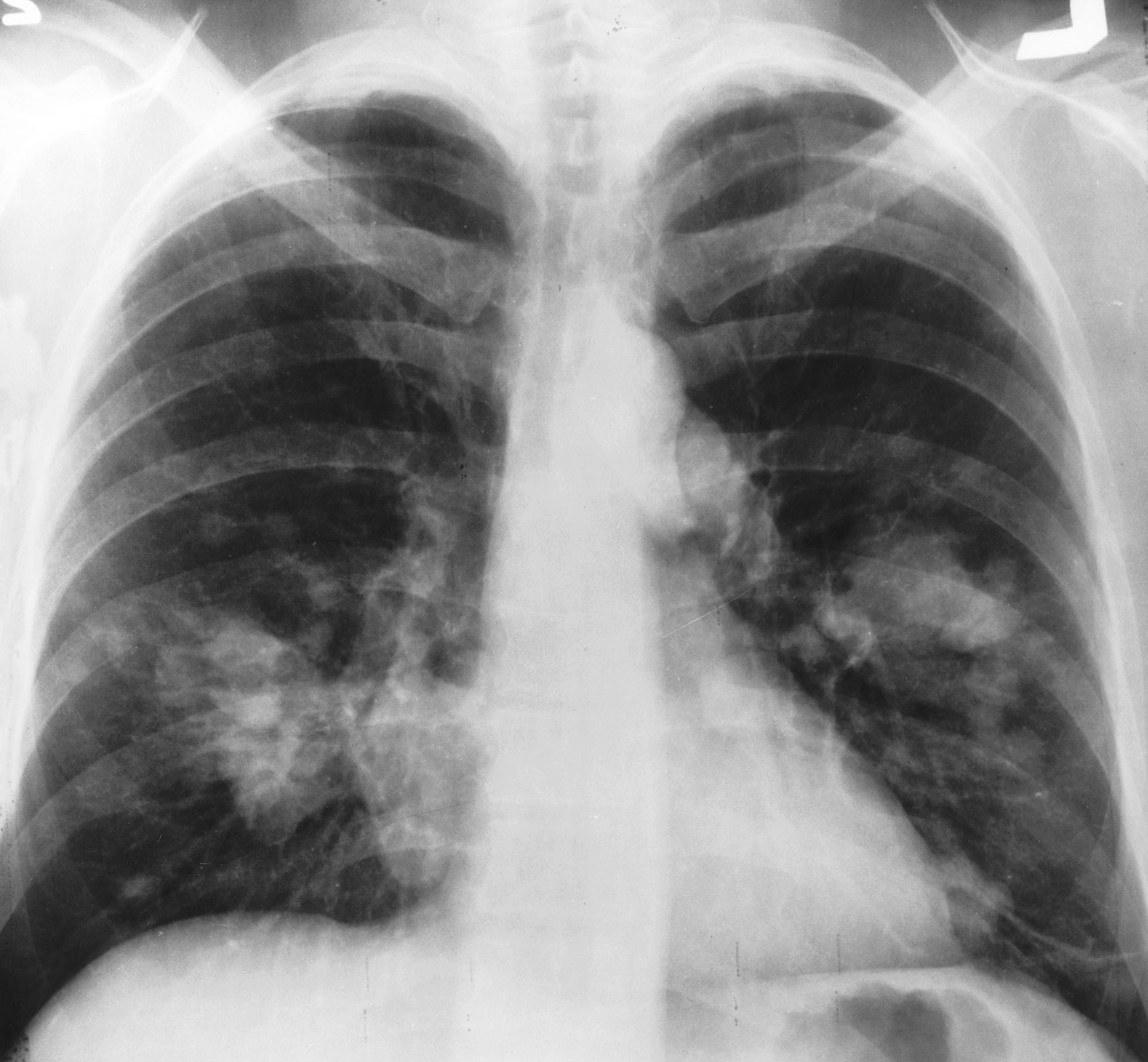
- An X-ray scan indicating abnormal masses in the lungs.
- Specialty: Oncology
- Types: Small cell, non-small cell
- Risk factors: Tobacco, asbestos, radon gas
- Treatment: Radiation therapy, surgery, chemotherapy, and targeted therapy.
- Deaths: 9,168 (2018)

Lung cancer in Australia has killed more than 9,000 people and there are estimated to be over 12,500 new cases as of 2018. Lung cancer is the leading cause of cancer death in Australia and is responsible for one fifth of cancer diagnosis in the nation. It is differentiated into two different types: Non-small cell lung cancer and small cell-lung cancer. There are a range of diagnostic and treatment options available to treat both disease types. Smoking tobacco cigarettes is considered the leading risk factor of lung cancer in Australia, and Government-led public health schemes have aimed to reduce smoking and minimise its lung cancer risk. There has been relative success in these campaigns, and in treatment, as survival rates have improved from 9.2% to 17% as of 2014.Attitudes towards habitual smoking in youth and young adult groups have also subsequently changed in response to this. However, there is a growing stigma surrounding people living with Lung Cancer, and a large portion of work conducted by the Lung Foundation Australia is directed towards supporting the health and welfare of those affected.

== Prevalence ==
As of 2018, lung cancer remains the leading cause of cancer death in Australia. According to Cancer Australia, it is the fifth most common diagnosed cancer in Australia behind breast, prostate, colorectal and skin cancers. There were 9,168 deaths due to lung cancer in 2018, with 5,229 males and 3,969 females reported by Cancer Australia. Further estimates by Cancer Australia have also predicted that individuals succumbing to lung cancer by the age of 85 will be 1 in 23, being more likely in men than in women. Lung cancer is more commonly diagnosed within smokers over the age of 60. It was the most commonly diagnosed cancer among Indigenous Australians in the 4-year span from 2008 to 2012.

== Risk factors ==
There are a number of associated risk factors in the onset and progression of lung cancer, however the major contributor is tobacco smoking.

=== Smoking ===
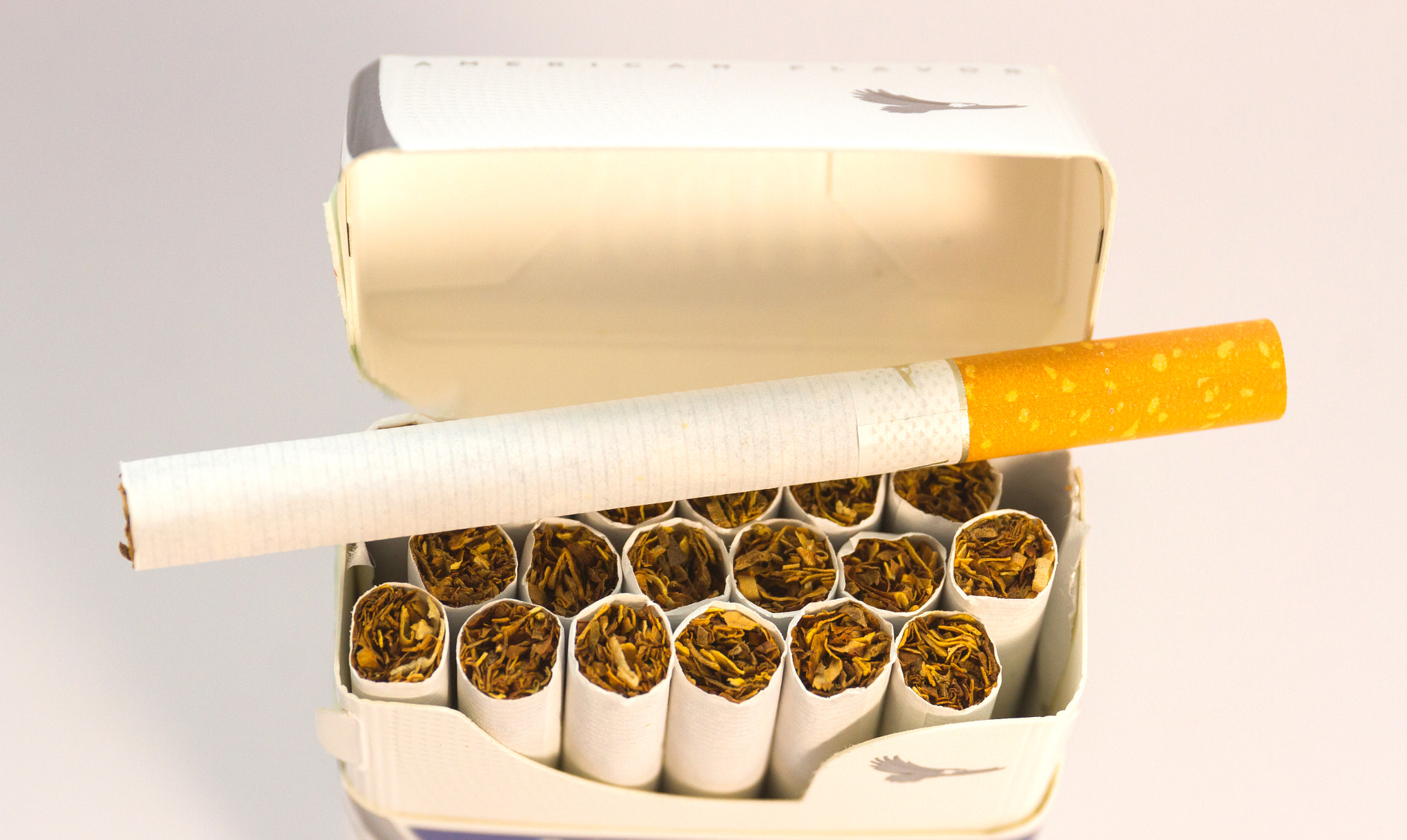
Cigarette smoking is considered the leading cause of lung cancer in Australia.

Smoking contributes to 90% of lung cancer diagnosis. This is because cigarette and tobacco smoke contain several known carcinogens that alter and damage DNA sequences affecting its ability to proliferate, undergo apoptosis and DNA repair. Carcinogens include benzene, 2-napthylamine, 4-aminobiphenyl, chromium, cadmium, vinyl chloride, ethylene oxide, arsenic, beryllium, nickel and polnium-210. In addition, nicotine is also an active.

=== Asbestos ===
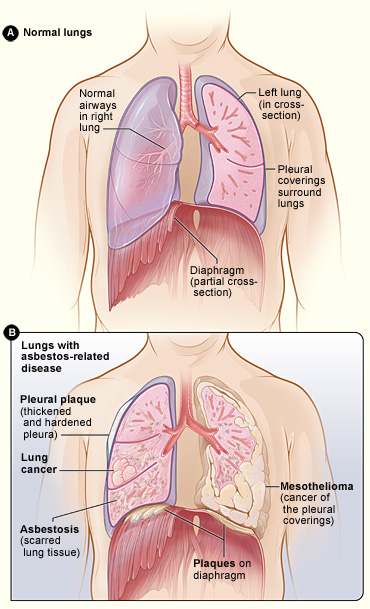
The carcinogenic effects of asbestos on the lungs.

Asbestos are fibrous material that are found in many industrial buildings in Australia from the 1940s to 1987 . Exposure to asbestos occurs through inhalation of the particulates contained in these fibrous material, and they quickly become trapped and deposited in the airways and passages of the lungs. As such, the exposure to asbestos increases the risk of developing cancers in the lung, ovary and pharynx. The incidence of these cancers are said to occur decades after initial exposure to asbestos. Products containing asbestos were eventually phased out towards the end of the 1980s, and a complete ban on asbestos was initiated in 2003. State and federal law in Australia have guidelines in their duty of care conduct of both employers and employees to reduce the risk of asbestos exposure.

=== Radon gas ===
Radon is a chemically inert gas that has no colour, smell or taste. It is the byproduct of radium when it undergoes radioactive decay. As such, radon is implicated in lung cancer particularly as it is breathed in and deposited in the lungs This consequently damages the lining of the lungs and eventually, long-term exposure leads to the development of lung cancer.

== Government spending ==
According to the Australian Institute of Health and Welfare, health care expenditure on lung cancer in Australia reached $122.5 million in the period of 2008-2009. This total accounted for 5% of the total cancer expenditure in the 2008-2009 Financial Year. Much of this was largely dedicated towards hospital-admitted patient costs, taking up 91% of the expenditure. This was subsequently followed by out-patient services and prescription medications. A report released by the Lung Foundation Australia detailed the economic burden of lung cancer in Australia in 2018. It reported $283.7 million was spent on direct costs including treatment and of out-hospital costs, and $13.5 million in indirect costs resulting from absent days from work The Lung Foundation Australia project that these costs will rise over the next 10 years, culminating in $6.2 billion direct costs and $325.9 million in indirect costs

== Public health campaigns ==
Much of the lung cancer deaths in Australia have been attributed to cigarette smoking and many public health schemes have been introduced to increase awareness of the risk of smoking. A number of campaigns have been launched across Australia, most notably QuitNow, which aims to support and encourage Australians to cease smoking. Furthermore, the resources at QuitNow also serve to inform and educate the wider Australian population of the health benefits that cessation has, and guidelines to help families and friends of smokers. In addition, both Federal and State Governments in 2006 initiated schemes that provided graphic health warnings on cigarette packages to reduce youth smoking rates. These would often depict the grotesque effects of smoking on the body as a whole, capturing the detrimental effects on the lungs, heart and brain. The campaign also ventured into television advertisements and large public billboards. Cancer Council Australia have also led nation-wide initiatives in the prevention and minimisation of lung cancer. In tandem with state and territory bodies, Cancer Council Australia conduct clinical research to understand the broad mechanisms of lung cancer.

=== Effectiveness of anti-smoking campaigns ===
The implementation of plain packaging on cigarette packages has seen changing attitudes towards habitual smoking particularly in adolescent and young adult age groups. A study conducted by the Cancer Institute of NSW highlighted that youth support for plain packing of cigarettes increased, with 60% of 12-17 year olds and 67% of 18-24 in favour. The study also mentioned that 1 in 3 teenage smokers aged 12–17, were less likely to continue smoking because of plain packaging. Dunlop and her colleagues also conclude that 41% of teenage smokers considered quitting as a result of plain packaging on cigarette boxes.

=== Changing public perception of lung cancer ===
In 2018, the Lung Foundation Australia in partnership with PricewaterhouseCoopers (PwC) released a report highlighting the extent of lung cancer burden in Australia in the present and future..... One of the findings of the report highlighted that there is a growing stigma towards people living with lung cancer from their communities, health providers, employers and even themselves. According to a study by Jarrett (2015) of Vanderbilt University, approximately 30% of individuals with lung cancer blame themselves for their diagnosis Furthermore, a national survey conducted by the Lung Foundation Australia also revealed that over a third of Australians believed that individuals living with lung cancer "only have themselves to blame", whilst a tenth believed "they got what they deserved" It also highlighted that 35% of lung cancer patients chose not to disclose their diagnosis in fear of judgement from others The social stigmas of living with lung cancer were also identified by Sriram and colleagues in 2017, revealing that a third of Australians have less sympathy for people living with lung cancer than any other form of cancer These alarming statistics compelled the Lung Foundation Australia to initiate health services that will monitor and support the mental and psychological health of people living with lung cancer.

== Survival rates ==
The 5-year survival rates of lung cancer in Australia as of 2014 stands at 17%... In previous years, lung cancer survival in Australia was 13% from 2000-2007 Furthermore, during this period the survival rate was significantly higher in females (15%) than males (11%) In comparison to other cancers in Australia, the prognosis and survival rates of lung cancer were much poorer in both males and females. According to statistics from the Australian Institute of Health and Welfare, the 5-year survival rate of lung cancer in men (11%) was 6-8 times lower than the 5-year survival rates of prostate cancer (89%), lymphoid cancers (64%) and bowel cancer (63%) in men. Correspondingly, these alarming statistics are also seen in comparison with diagnosis of cancers in women. The 5-year survival rates of lung cancer in women (15%) are 4-6 times lower than survival rates for breast cancer (89%), lymphoid (65%) and bowel cancers (64%). It has been suggested that the relatively low survival rates of lung cancer in both men and women are due to diagnosis made when the cancer has reached an advanced stage, and unable to respond effectively to treatment.

== See also ==
- Health in Australia
