= Paratracheal lymph nodes =

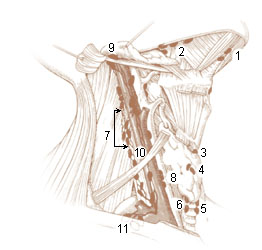
- Deep Lymph Nodes: 1. Submental; 2. Submandibular (Submaxillary); Anterior Cervical Lymph Nodes (Deep): 3. Prelaryngeal; 4. Thyroid; 5. Pretracheal; 6. Paratracheal; Deep Cervical Lymph Nodes: 7. Lateral jugular 8. Anterior jugular 9. Jugulodigastric; Inferior Deep Cervical Lymph Nodes: 10. Juguloomohyoid; 11. Supraclavicular (scalene)

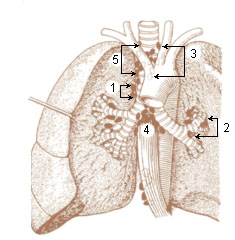
- 1. Pulmonary Juxtaesophageal; 2. Bronchopulmonary (Hilar); 3. Superior Tracheobronchial; 4. Inferior Tracheobronchial; 5. Paratracheal

Details
- System: Lymphatic system
- Drains to: Bronchomediastinal lymph trunks

Identifiers
- Latin: nodi lymphoidei paratracheales

The right and left paratracheal lymph nodes (or paratracheal chains) are lymph nodes in the neck situated lateral to the trachea and esophagus alongside the recurrent laryngeal nerve. They drain to the deep cervical lymph nodes.
