= Pulmonary branches of vagus nerve =

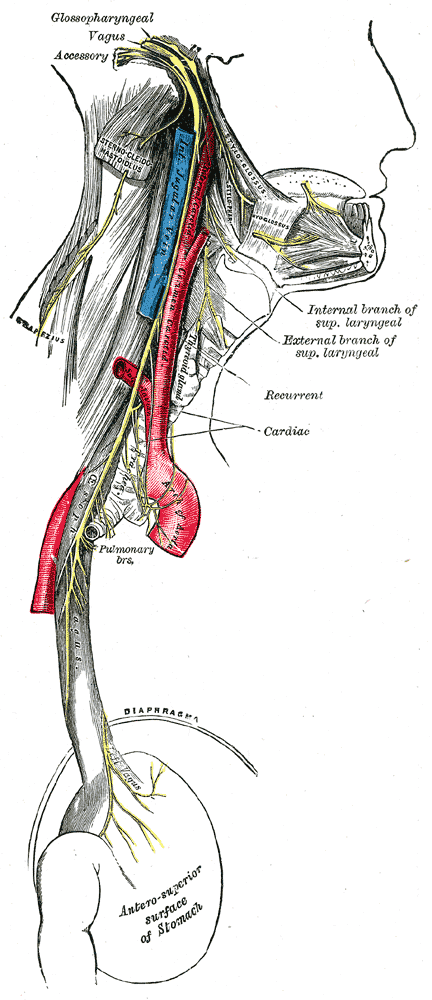
- Course and distribution of the glossopharyngeal, vagus, and accessory nerves. (Label for "Pulmonary brs." visible at center right.)

Details
- From: Vagus nerve
- Innervates: Bronchi

Identifiers
- Latin: rami bronchiales nervi vagi
- TA98: A14.2.01.171
- TA2: 6350
- FMA: 65515

The pulmonary branches of the vagus nerve can be divided into two groups: anterior and posterior.

== Anterior ==
The Anterior Bronchial Branches (rami bronchiales anteriores; anterior or ventral pulmonary branches), two or three in number, and of small size, are distributed on the anterior surface of the root of the lung.

They join with filaments from the sympathetic, and form the anterior pulmonary plexus.

== Posterior ==
The Posterior Bronchial Branches (rami bronchiales posteriores; posterior or dorsal pulmonary branches), more numerous and larger than the anterior, are distributed on the posterior surface of the root of the lung; they are joined by filaments from the third and fourth (sometimes also from the first and second) thoracic ganglia of the sympathetic trunk, and form the posterior pulmonary plexus.

Branches from this plexus accompany the ramifications of the bronchi through the substance of the lung.
