= Eparterial bronchus =

Branch of the right main bronchus

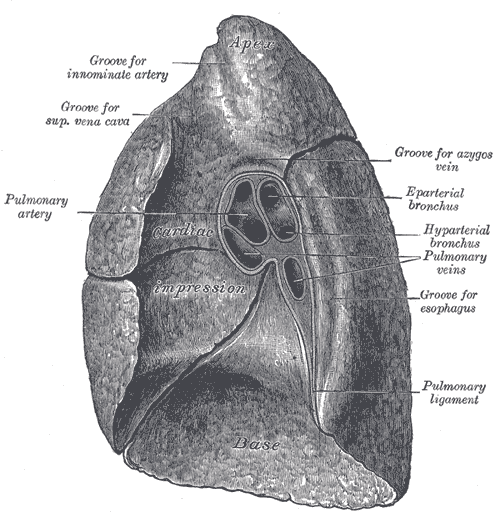
- Mediastinal surface of right lung. (Eparterial bronchus labeled at center right.)

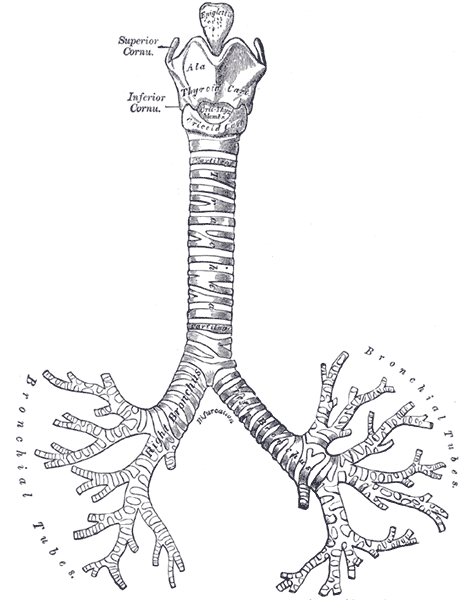
- Front view of cartilages of larynx, trachea, and bronchi. (Eparterial bronchus not labeled, but visible at center left.)

Details

Identifiers
- Latin: bronchus lobaris superior dexter
- TA98: A06.4.02.002
- TA2: 3238
- FMA: 7397

The eparterial bronchus (right superior lobar bronchus) is a branch of the right main bronchus given off about 2.5 cm from the bifurcation of the trachea. This branch supplies the superior lobe of the right lung and is the most superior of all secondary bronchi. It arises above the level of the right pulmonary artery, and for this reason is named the eparterial bronchus. All other distributions falling below the pulmonary artery are termed hyparterial.

The eparterial bronchus is the only secondary bronchus with a specific name apart from the name of its corresponding lobe.

== Name ==
The classification of eparterial and hyparterial is attributed to Swiss anatomist and anthropologist Christoph Theodor Aeby, and is central to his model of the anatomical lung. He presented this model in a monograph titled, "Der Bronchialbaum der Säugethiere und des Menschen, nebst Bemerkungen über den Bronchialbaum der Vögel und Reptilien".
