= Bronchocele =

Medical condition of the respiratory system

- Other names: bronchial mucocele
- Specialty: Pulmonology
- Causes: impacted mucoid secretions in the bronchi

A bronchocele is a segment of bronchus that is filled with mucus and completely enclosed so the mucus cannot drain out. This segment is usually dilated. It is also referred to as bronchial mucocele. If there is no obstruction to the flow of mucus, it is called mucoid impaction of bronchus. A bronchocele results from obstruction of the bronchus. Overproduction of mucus can also contribute. Obstruction may occur due to scarring, a tumor, or congenital atresia.
