= Tracheobronchial lymph nodes =

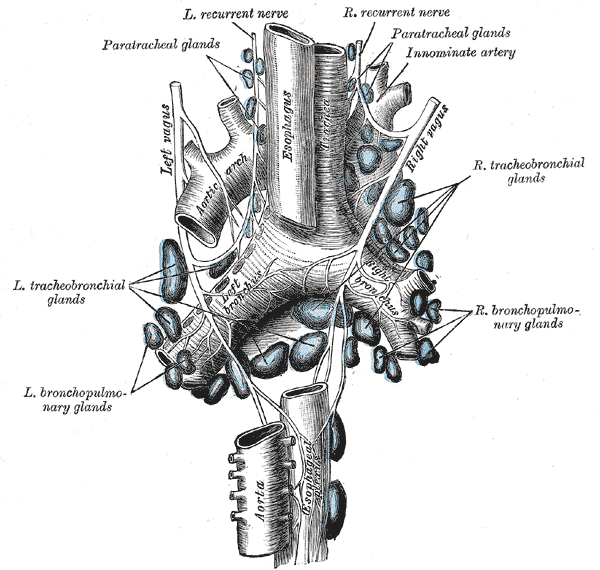
- The tracheobronchial lymph glands.

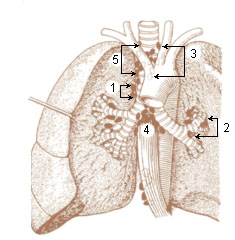
- 1. Pulmonary juxtaesophageal 2. Bronchopulmonary (hilar); 3. Superior tracheobronchial 4. Inferior tracheobronchial 5. Paratracheal

Details
- System: Lymphatic system
- Drains to: Bronchomediastinal trunk

Identifiers
- Latin: nodi lymphoidei tracheobronchiales
- TA98: A13.3.02.012
- FMA: 71766

The tracheobronchial lymph nodes are lymph nodes that are located around the division of trachea and main bronchi.

== Structure ==
These lymph nodes form four main groups including paratracheal, tracheobronchial, bronchopulmonary and pulmonary nodes.

1. Paratracheal nodes are located on either side of the trachea.
2. Tracheobronchial nodes can be divided into three nodes including left and right superior tracheobronchial nodes, and the inferior tracheobronchial node. The two superior tracheobronchial nodes are located on either side of trachea just before its bifurcation. The inferior tracheobronchial node is located just below the bifurcation in the angle between the two bronchi.
3. Bronchopulmonary nodes (hilar nodes) situate in the hilum of each lung.
4. Pulmonary nodes are embedded the lung substance on the larger branches of the bronchi.

The afferents of the tracheobronchial glands drain the lungs and bronchi, the thoracic part of the trachea and the heart; some of the efferents of the posterior mediastinal glands also end in this group.

Their efferent vessels ascend upon the trachea and unite with efferents of the internal mammary and anterior mediastinal glands to form the right and left bronchomediastinal trunks.
