= Hilum (anatomy) =

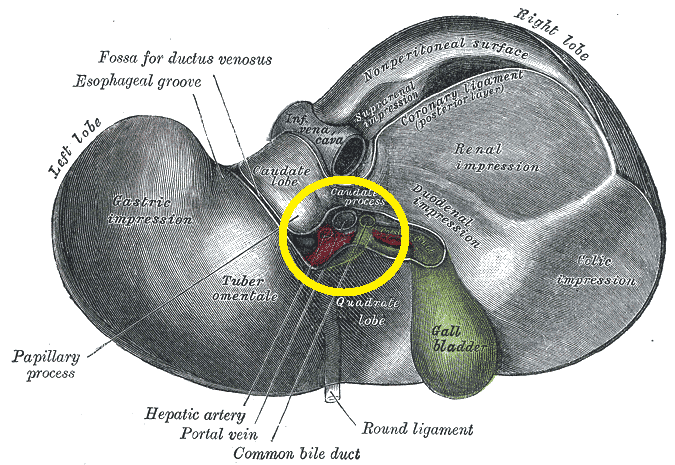
The liver, viewed from the lower back. The yellow circle indicates the hilum of the liver.

In human anatomy, the hilum (/ˈhaɪləm/; pl.: hila), sometimes formerly called a hilus (/ˈhaɪləs/; pl.: hili), is a depression or fissure where structures such as blood vessels and nerves enter an organ. Examples include:

- Hilum of kidney, admits the renal artery, vein, ureter, and nerves
- Splenic hilum, on the surface of the spleen, admits the splenic artery, vein, lymph vessels, and nerves
- Hilum of lung, a triangular depression where the structures which form the root of the lung enter and leave the viscus
- Hilum of lymph node, the portion of a lymph node where the efferent vessels exit
