= List of common misconceptions about science, technology, and mathematics =

Each entry on this list of common misconceptions is worded as a correction; the misconceptions themselves are implied rather than stated. These entries are concise summaries; the main subject articles can be consulted for more detail.

== Astronomy and spaceflight ==
- There is no scientific evidence that the motion of stars, planets, and other celestial bodies influences the fates of humans, and astrology has repeatedly been shown to have no explanatory power in predicting future events.
- Astronauts in orbit have the sensation of being weightless because they are in free fall around the Earth, not because they are so far away from the Earth that its gravitational pull is negligible. For example, on the International Space Station the Earth's gravity is nearly 90% as strong as at the surface. Objects orbiting in space would not remain in orbit if not for the gravitational force, and gravitational fields extend infinitely, though the strength of the gravitational force is attenuated with distance. There is no limit to the distance across which two objects exert gravitational forces upon one another.
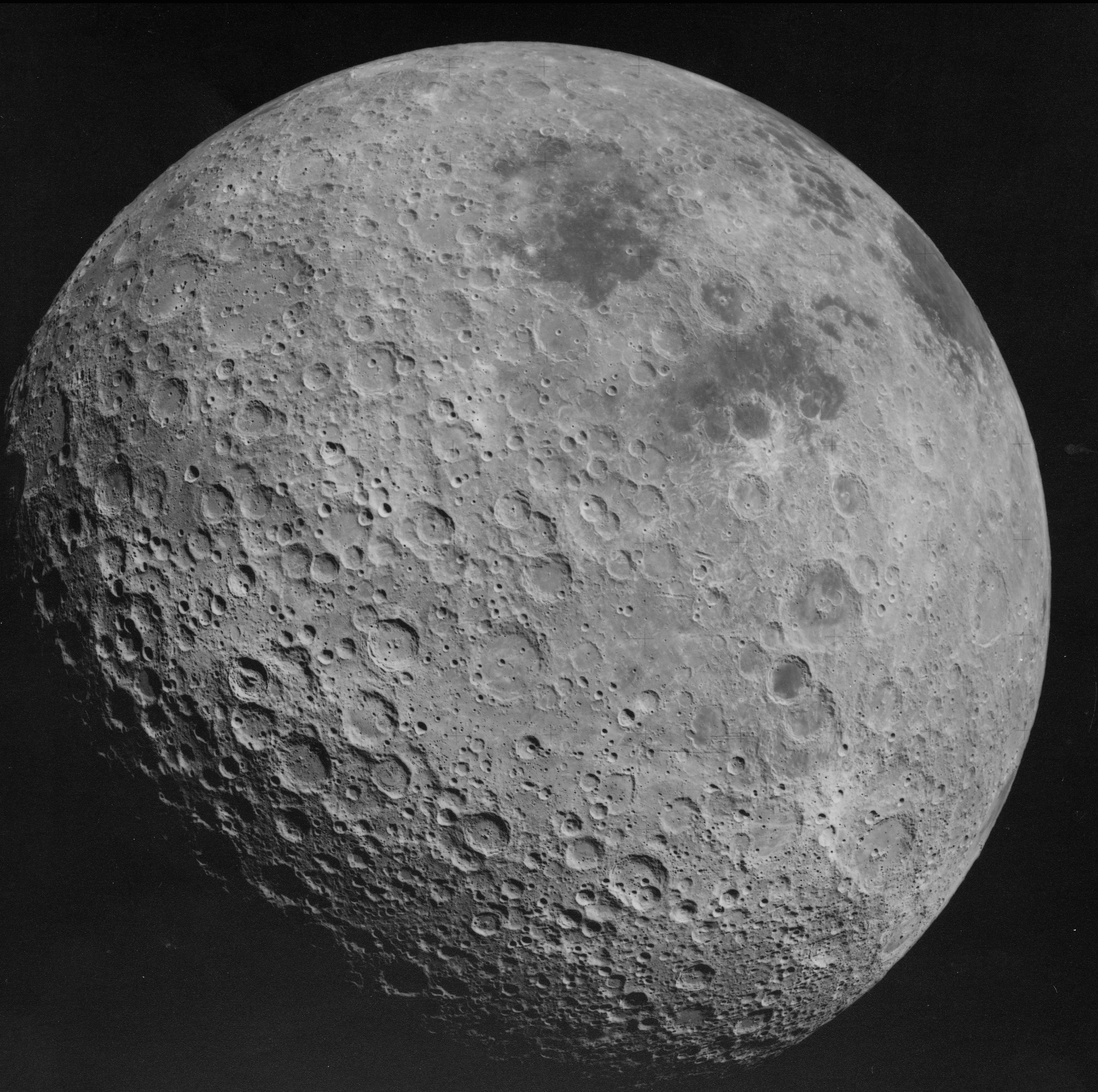
- The dark side of the Moon directly illuminated by the Sun
  The far side of the Moon, also called the dark side of the Moon, receives about the same amount of light from the Sun as the near side. Since the same side of the Moon always faces the Earth due to tidal locking, the far side had not been seen until Luna 3 photographed it in 1959. Hence, "dark" refers to the far side being unseen from Earth, not to any lack of illumination by the Sun.
- Black holes have the same gravitational effects as any other equal mass in their place. They will draw objects towards them according to distance and mass, just as any other celestial body does, except at very close distances to the black hole, comparable to its Schwarzschild radius. If, for example, the Sun were replaced by a black hole of equal mass, the orbits of the planets would be essentially unaffected.
- Earth's equator does not line up with the ecliptic (plane of Earth's orbit), so for half of the year, the Northern Hemisphere is tilted more toward the Sun, and for the other half, the Northern Hemisphere is tilted more away, causing seasonal temperature variation.
  Seasons are not caused by Earth being closer to the Sun in the summer than in the winter, but by the effects of Earth's 23.4-degree axial tilt. Each hemisphere is tilted towards the Sun in its respective summer, resulting in longer days and more perpendicular sunlight, with the opposite being true in the winter. Earth reaches the point in its orbit closest to the Sun in January, and it reaches the point farthest from the Sun in July, so the slight contribution of orbital eccentricity opposes the temperature trends of the seasons in the Northern Hemisphere.
- When a meteor or spacecraft enters the atmosphere, the heat of entry is not primarily caused by friction, but by adiabatic compression of air in front of the object.
- Egg balancing is possible on every day of the year, not just the vernal equinox.
- The Fisher Space Pen was not commissioned by NASA at a cost of millions of dollars, while the Soviets used pencils. Pencils posed a major risk to astronauts due to the release of substances such as shavings and pencil lead being a flight hazard. The pen was independently developed by Paul C. Fisher, founder of the Fisher Pen Company, with $1 million of his own funds (equivalent to $10 million in 2025). NASA tested and approved the pen for space use, then purchased 400 pens at $6 per pen (equivalent to $58 in 2025). The Soviet Union subsequently also purchased the Space Pen for its Soyuz spaceflights.
- Tang, Velcro, and Teflon were not spun off from technology originally developed by NASA for spaceflight, though many other products (such as memory foam and space blankets) were.
- The Sun is not yellow; rather, it emits light across the full spectrum of visible colors, and this combined light appears white when outside of Earth's atmosphere. Earth's atmosphere scatters shorter wavelengths of light, particularly blues and violets, more than longer wavelengths like reds and yellows, and this scattering is why the Sun appears yellow during the day or orange or red during sunrise and sunset. The scattered blue/violet light, appearing to come from all directions, is what makes the rest of the sky look blue.
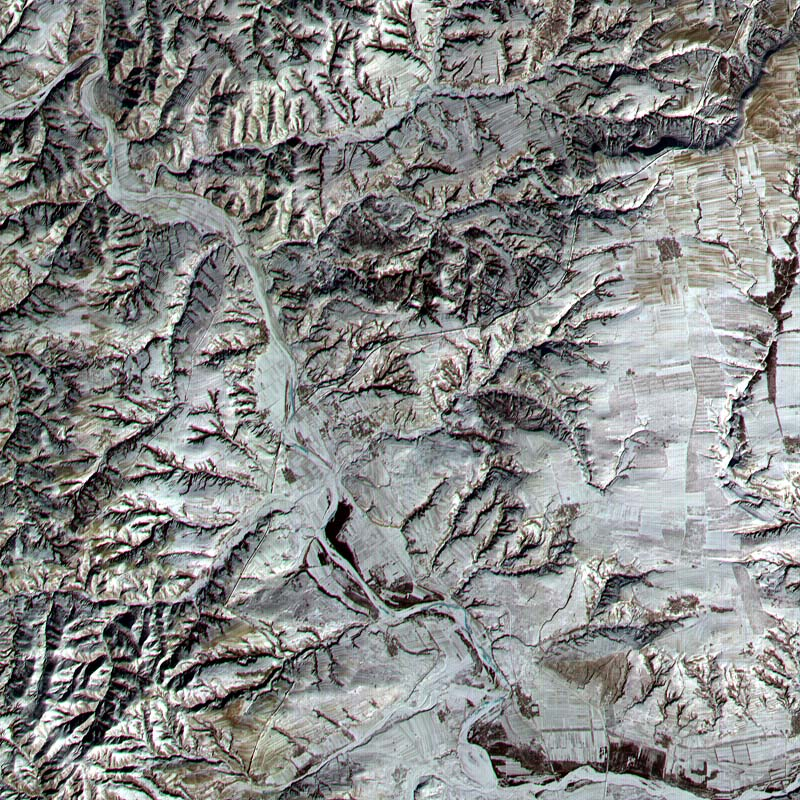
- A satellite image of a section of the Great Wall of China, running diagonally from lower left to upper right (not to be confused with the much more prominent river running from upper left to lower right)
  The Great Wall of China is not the only human-made object visible from space or from the Moon. None of the Apollo astronauts reported seeing any specific human-made object from the Moon, and even Earth-orbiting astronauts can see it only with magnification. City lights, however, are easily visible on the night side of Earth from orbit.
- The Big Bang model does not fully explain the origin of the universe. It does not describe how energy, time, and space were caused, but rather it describes the emergence of the present universe from an ultra-dense and high-temperature initial state.

== Biology ==
=== Mammals ===
- Bats are not blind. While about 70% of bat species, mainly in the microbat family, use echolocation to navigate, all bat species have eyes and are capable of sight. In addition, almost all bats in the megabat or fruit bat family cannot echolocate and have excellent night vision.
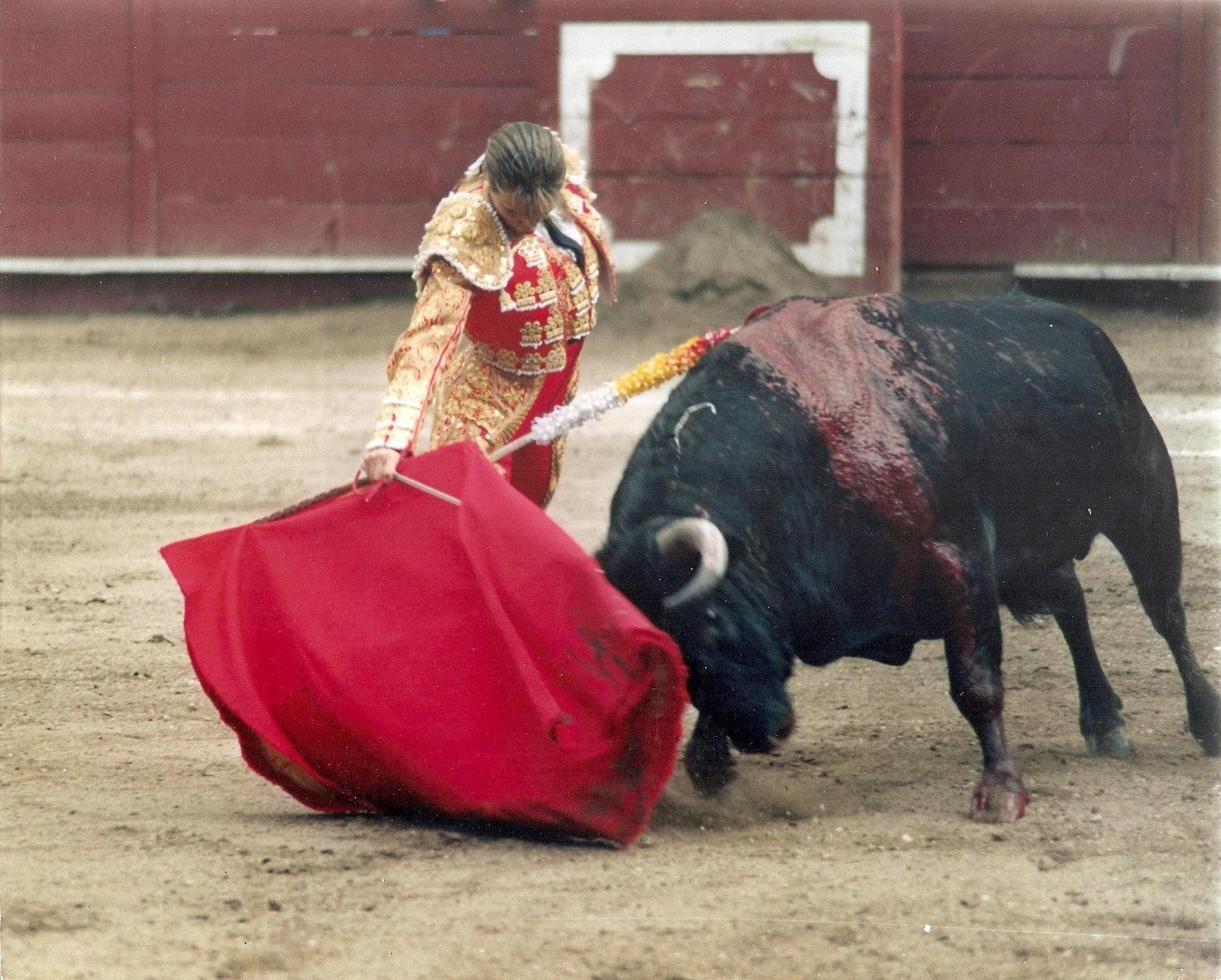
- The color of a red cape does not enrage a bull.
  Bulls are not enraged by the color red, used in capes by professional bullfighters. Cattle are dichromats, so red does not stand out as a bright color. It is not the color of the cape, but the perceived threat by the bullfighter that incites it to charge, along with the spearing of the bull, mental agitation and abuse it endures beforehand.
- Camels do not store water in their humps, but rather fatty tissue which can be used as a reserve source of calories. While they can go long periods without water, the water is stored in the animal's bloodstream, not their humps.
- Domestic cats' behavioral and personality traits cannot be predicted from their coat color. Rather, these traits depend on a complex interplay between genetic and environmental factors.
- Not all cats are attracted and intoxicated by catnip, which affects only about two thirds of them. Alternatives exist, such as valerian root and leaves.
- Dogs do not sweat by salivating. Dogs actually do have sweat glands, but not on their tongues; they sweat mainly through their footpads. However, dogs do primarily regulate their body temperature through panting. (See also: Dog anatomy § Temperature regulation)
- Dogs do not consistently age seven times as quickly as humans. Aging in dogs varies widely depending on the breed; certain breeds, such as giant dog breeds and English Bulldogs, have much shorter lifespans than average. Most dogs reach adolescence by one year old; smaller and medium-sized breeds begin to age more slowly in adulthood.
- Old elephants near death do not leave their herd to go to an "elephants' graveyard" to die.
- The hippopotamus does not produce pink milk, nor does it sweat blood. The skin secretions of the hippopotamus are red due to the presence of hipposudoric acid, a red pigment which acts as a natural sunscreen, and is neither sweat nor blood. It does not affect the color of their milk, which is white or beige.
- Lemmings do not engage in mass suicide by diving off cliffs. The idea was popularized by the 1958 Disney documentary film White Wilderness, in which the lemmings were repeatedly shoved off a cliff by the filmmakers to create the illusion of a mass suicide. The misconception itself is much older, dating back to at least the late 19th century, though its exact origins are uncertain.
- Mice do not have a special appetite for cheese, and will eat it only for lack of better options; they actually favor sweet sugary foods. The myth may have come from the fact that before the advent of refrigeration, cheese was usually stored outside and was therefore a food easy for mice to reach.
- Porcupines do not shoot their quills. They can detach, and porcupines will deliberately back into attackers to impale them, but their quills do not project.
- Rabbits are not especially partial to carrots. Their diet in the wild primarily consists of dark green vegetables such as grasses and clovers, and excessive carrot consumption is unhealthy for them due to containing high levels of sugar.
- Tomato juice and sauce are ineffective at neutralizing the odor of a skunk. Rather, due to olfactory fatigue, a person sprayed by a skunk loses sensitivity to the smell over time. Effective treatments for skunk odor involve artificial compounds rather than household remedies.
- There is no such thing as an "alpha" in a wolf pack. An early study that coined the term "alpha wolf" had observed only unrelated adult wolves living in captivity. In the wild, wolf packs operate like families: parents are in charge until the young grow up and start their own families, and younger wolves do not overthrow an "alpha" to become the new leader.
- The phases of the Moon have no effect on the vocalizations of wolves, and wolves do not howl at the Moon. Wolves howl to assemble the pack usually before and after hunts, to pass on an alarm particularly at a den site, to locate each other during a storm, while crossing unfamiliar territory, and to communicate across great distances.

=== Birds ===
- A human touching or handling eggs or baby birds will not cause the adult birds to abandon them. The same is generally true for other animals having their young touched by humans as well, with the possible exception of rabbits (as rabbits will sometimes abandon their nest after an event they perceive as traumatizing).
- Eating rice, yeast, or Alka-Seltzer does not cause birds to explode and is rarely fatal. Birds can flatulate and regurgitate to expel gas, and some birds even include wild rice as part of their diet. The misconception has often led to weddings using millet, confetti, or other materials to shower the newlyweds as they leave the ceremony, instead of the throwing of rice that is traditional in some places.
- Birds are not stupid. A wide variety of cognitive abilities have been observed in birds, particularly corvids and parrots. Tool use is also present in woodpecker finches.

Bald eagle call
A recording of a bald eagle at Yellowstone National Park

Red-tailed hawk call
A recording of a red-tailed hawk

- The bold, powerful cry commonly associated with the bald eagle in popular culture is actually that of a red-tailed hawk. Bald eagle vocalizations are much softer and chirpier, and bear far more resemblance to the calls of gulls.
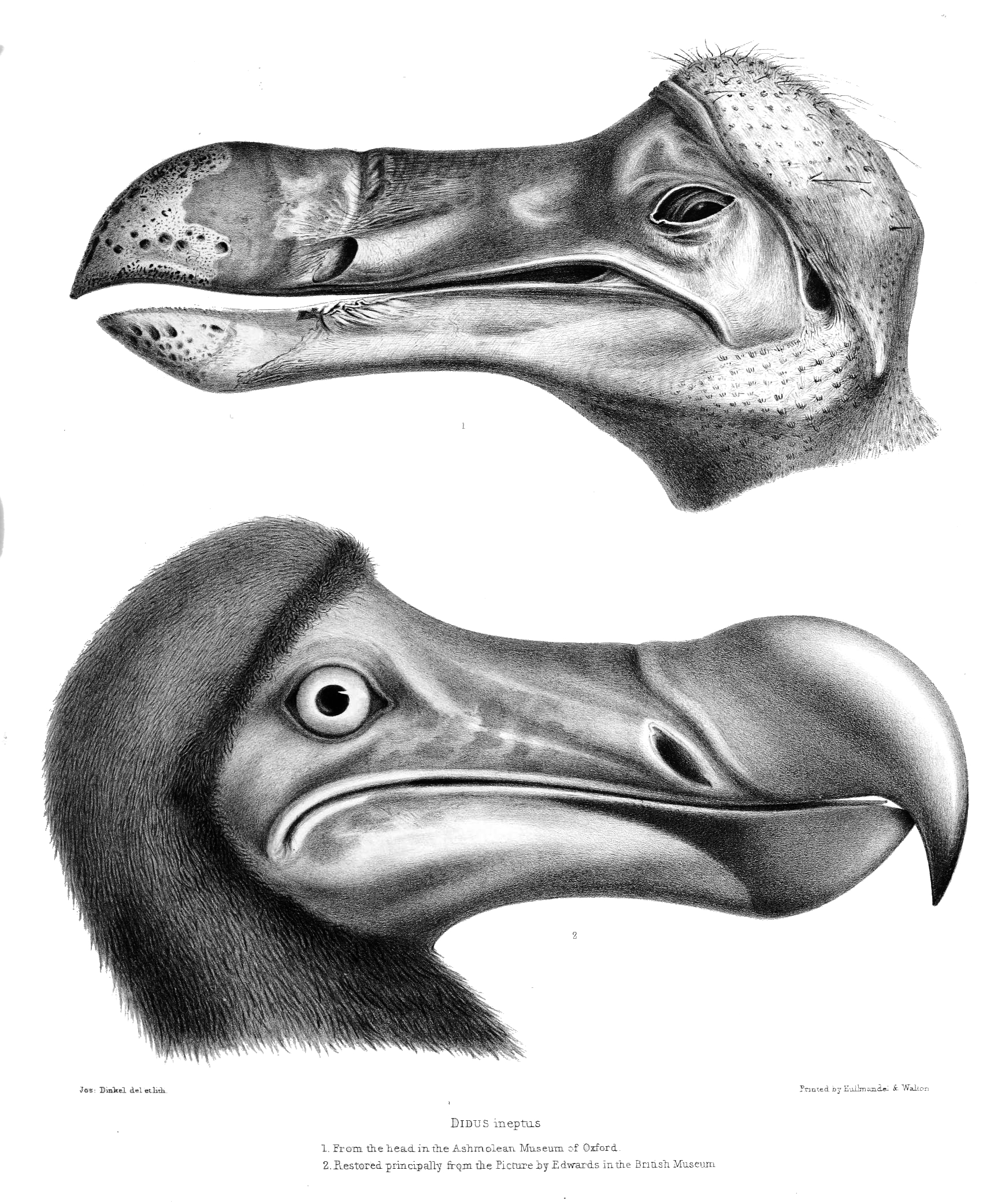
- The dodo was intelligent and inedible, despite popular belief.
  Despite the saying "dumb as a dodo", the dodo's intelligence was above average for an avian, as it was a member of the family Columbidae. The perceived stupidity of the dodo is due to naivety and passivity from living in isolation without significant predators.
- Many believe that the dodo was hunted to extinction by European settlers due to its high culinary value. However, the dodo's meat was stated to be inedible by historical accounts, as one of its early names given by the Dutch was Walghvoghel (repulsive bird). The dodo's decline was caused more by predation of their eggs from invasive species as opposed to direct predation from humans.
- A duck's quack actually does echo, although the echo may be difficult to hear for humans under some circumstances. Despite this, a British panel show compiling interesting facts was named Duck Quacks Don't Echo.
- Ostriches do not stick their heads in the sand to hide from enemies or to sleep. This misconception's origins are uncertain but it was probably popularized by Pliny the Elder (23–79 CE), who wrote that ostriches "imagine, when they have thrust their head and neck into a bush, that the whole of their body is concealed".
- Sixty common starlings were released in 1890 into New York's Central Park by Eugene Schieffelin, but there is no evidence that he was trying to introduce every bird species mentioned in the works of William Shakespeare into North America. This claim has been traced to an essay in 1948 by naturalist Edwin Way Teale, whose notes appear to indicate that it was speculation.

=== Other vertebrates ===
- There is no credible evidence that the candiru, a South American parasitic catfish, can swim up a human urethra if one urinates in the water in which it lives. The sole documented case of such an incident, written in 1997, has been heavily criticized upon peer review, and this phenomenon is now largely considered a myth.
- The skin of a chameleon is not adapted solely for camouflage purposes, nor can a chameleon change its skin color to match any background. Chameleons usually change color for social signaling, based on their mood, and for heat regulation. The use in social signaling may be to display bright colors for only brief periods of time to avoid increased visibility to predators.
- Contrary to the allegorical story about the boiling frog, frogs die immediately when cast into boiling water, rather than leaping out; furthermore, frogs will attempt to escape cold water that is slowly heated before reaching their critical thermal maximum.
- The Pacific tree frog and the Baja California chorus frog are some of the only frog species that make a "ribbit" sound. The misconception that all frogs, or at least all those found in North America, make this sound comes from its extensive use in Hollywood films.
- The memory span of goldfish is much longer than just a few seconds. It is up to a few months long.
- Pacus, South American fish related to piranhas, do not attack or feed on human testicles. This myth originated from a misinterpreted joke in a 2013 report of a pacu being found in Øresund, the strait between Sweden and Denmark, which claimed that the fish ate "nuts".
- Piranhas do not eat only meat but are omnivorous, and they swim in schools only to defend themselves from predators and not to attack. They very rarely attack humans, only when under stress and feeling threatened, and even then, bites typically only occur on hands and feet.
- Sharks can get cancer. The misconception that sharks do not get cancer was spread by the 1992 book Sharks Don't Get Cancer, which was used to sell extracts of shark cartilage as cancer prevention treatments. Reports of carcinomas in sharks exist, and current data does not support any conclusions about the incidence of tumors in sharks.
- Great white sharks do not mistake human divers for seals or other pinnipeds. When attacking pinnipeds, the shark surfaces quickly and attacks violently. In contrast, attacks on humans are slower and less violent: the shark charges at a normal pace, bites, and swims off. Great white sharks have efficient eyesight and color vision; the bite is not predatory, but rather for identification of an unfamiliar object.
- Snake jaws cannot unhinge. The posterior end of the lower jaw bones contains a quadrate bone, allowing jaw extension. The anterior tips of the lower jaw bones are joined by a flexible ligament allowing them to bow outwards, increasing the mouth gape.
- Snakes are not deaf or only able to sense ground vibrations. They can hear airborne sounds, though they cannot hear high-frequency sounds as well as humans can.
- Snake charmers do not charm the snakes with the music; snakes cannot hear airborne music the same way humans do. Instead, the charmer's swaying motion is what causes the snake to 'dance'.

=== Invertebrates ===
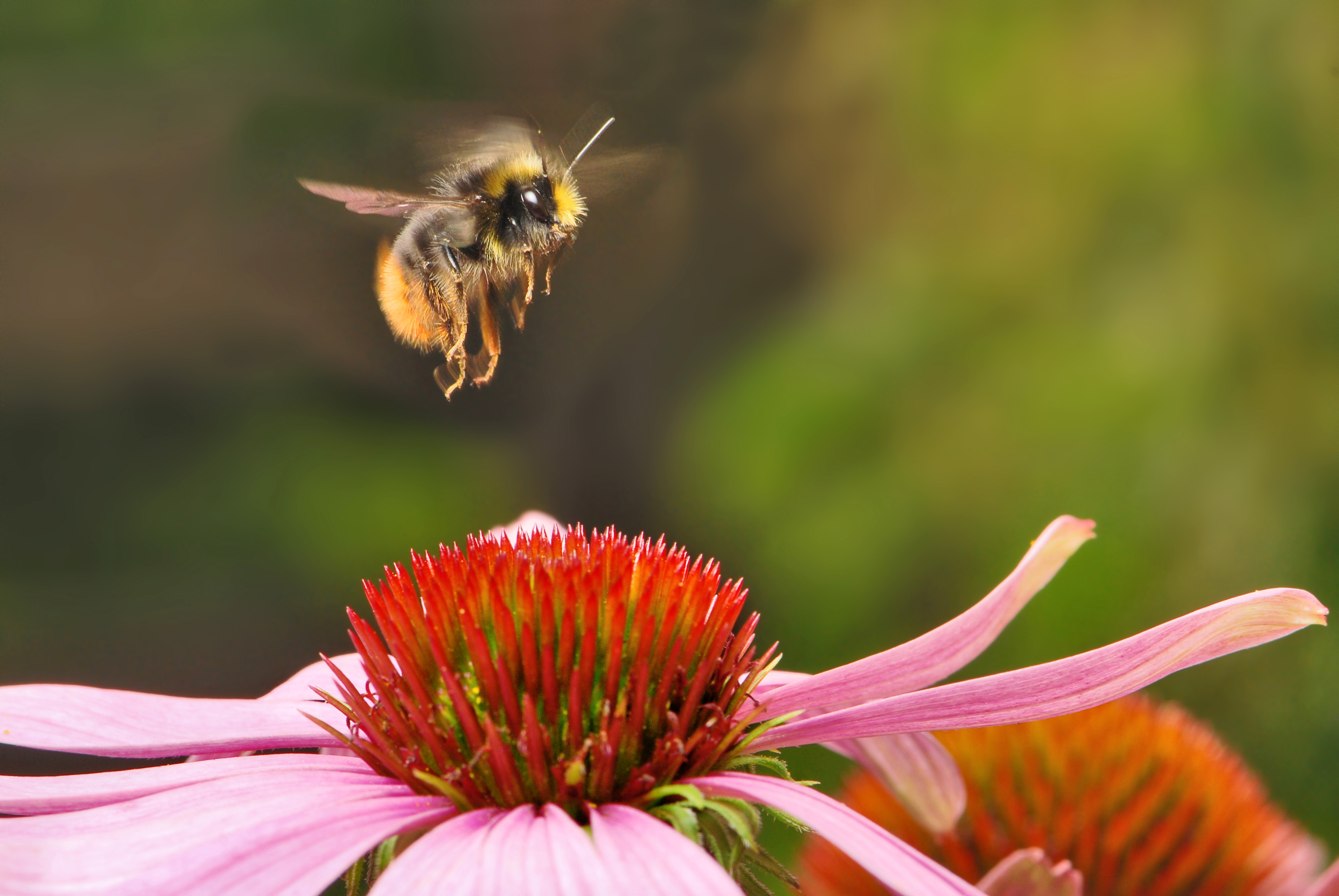
Aerodynamic theory does not predict that bumblebees should be incapable of flight.

- Aerodynamic theory does not predict that bumblebees should not be able to fly; the physics of insect flight is quite well understood. The misconception appears to come from a calculation based on a fixed-wing aircraft mentioned in a 1934 book, and was further popularized in the 2007 film Bee Movie.
- While certainly critical to the pollination of many plant species, European honey bees are not essential to human food production, despite claims that without their pollination, humanity would starve or die out "within four years". In fact, the most essential staple food crops on the planet, like wheat, maize, rice, soybeans and sorghum, are wind-pollinated or self-pollinating, and only slightly over 10% of the total human diet of plant crops is dependent upon insect pollination.
- Most bees do not die if they use their sting. This happens for only a small minority of species, including the honey bee, when they sting mammals. They survive when they sting other insects.
- Cockroaches would not be the only organisms capable of surviving in an environment contaminated with nuclear fallout. While cockroaches have a much higher radiation resistance than vertebrates, they are not immune to radiation poisoning, nor are they exceptionally radiation-resistant compared to other insects or smaller living beings. For comparison, parasitic wasps, tardigrades, and bacteria such as Deinococcus radiodurans have much higher radiation resistance compared to cockroaches.
- Earwigs are not known to purposely climb into external ear canals, though there have been anecdotal reports of earwigs being found in the ear. The name may be a reference to the appearance of their hindwings, which are unique and distinctive among insects, and resemble a human ear when unfolded.
- Houseflies have an average lifespan of 20 to 30 days, not 24 hours. However, females of the Dolania americana species of mayfly, which do not belong to the group of true flies, have an adult lifespan of as little as 5 minutes.
- Female praying mantises do not always eat the males during mating.
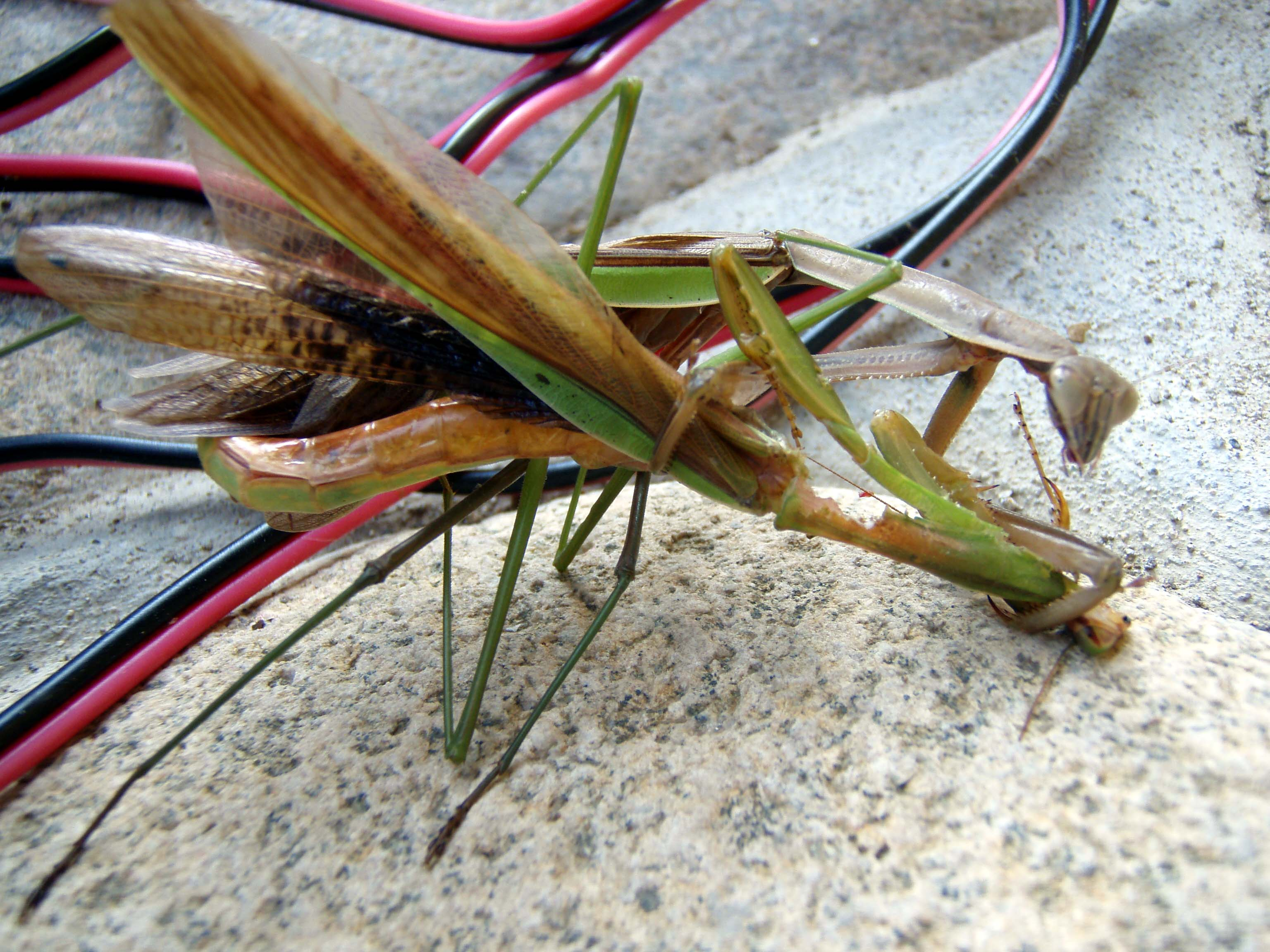
  A female Chinese mantis simultaneously copulating with and cannibalizing her mate; this does not occur every time mantises mate.
- The daddy longlegs spider (Pholcidae) is not the most venomous spider in the world. Their fangs are capable of piercing human skin, but the tiny amount of venom they carry causes only a mild burning sensation for a few seconds. Other species such as harvestmen and crane flies are also called daddy longlegs, and share the misconception of being highly venomous but unable to pierce the skin of humans.
- People do not swallow large numbers of spiders during sleep. A sleeping person makes noises that warn spiders of danger. Most people also wake up from sleep when they have a spider on their face.
- Though they are often called "white ants", termites are not ants, nor are they closely related to ants. Termites are actually highly derived cockroaches.
- Ticks do not jump or fall from trees onto their hosts. Instead, they lie in wait to grasp and climb onto any passing host or otherwise trace down hosts via, for example, olfactory stimuli, the host's body heat, or carbon dioxide in the host's breath.
- Not all earthworms become two worms when cut in half. Only a limited number of earthworm species are capable of anterior regeneration.
- Applying urine to jellyfish stings does not relieve pain and may make the pain worse. The best immediate treatment for jellyfish stings is to rinse them in salt water. For some kinds of jellyfish stings, adding vinegar helps.
- The Giant clam is neither aggressive towards humans nor is it able to snap human body parts. The closing movement is very slow and some specimen cannot completely close at all.

=== Plants ===
- Mushrooms, molds, and other fungi are not plants, despite similarities in their morphology and lifestyle. The historical classification of fungi as plants is defunct, and although they are still commonly included in botany curricula and textbooks, modern molecular evidence shows that fungi are more closely related to animals than to plants.
- Poinsettias are not highly toxic to humans or cats. While it is true that they are mildly irritating to the skin or stomach, and may sometimes cause diarrhea and vomiting if eaten, they rarely cause serious medical problems.
- Sunflowers do not always point to the Sun. Flowering sunflowers face a fixed direction (often east) all day long, but do not necessarily face the Sun. However, in an earlier developmental stage, before the appearance of flower heads, the immature buds do track the Sun (a phenomenon called heliotropism).
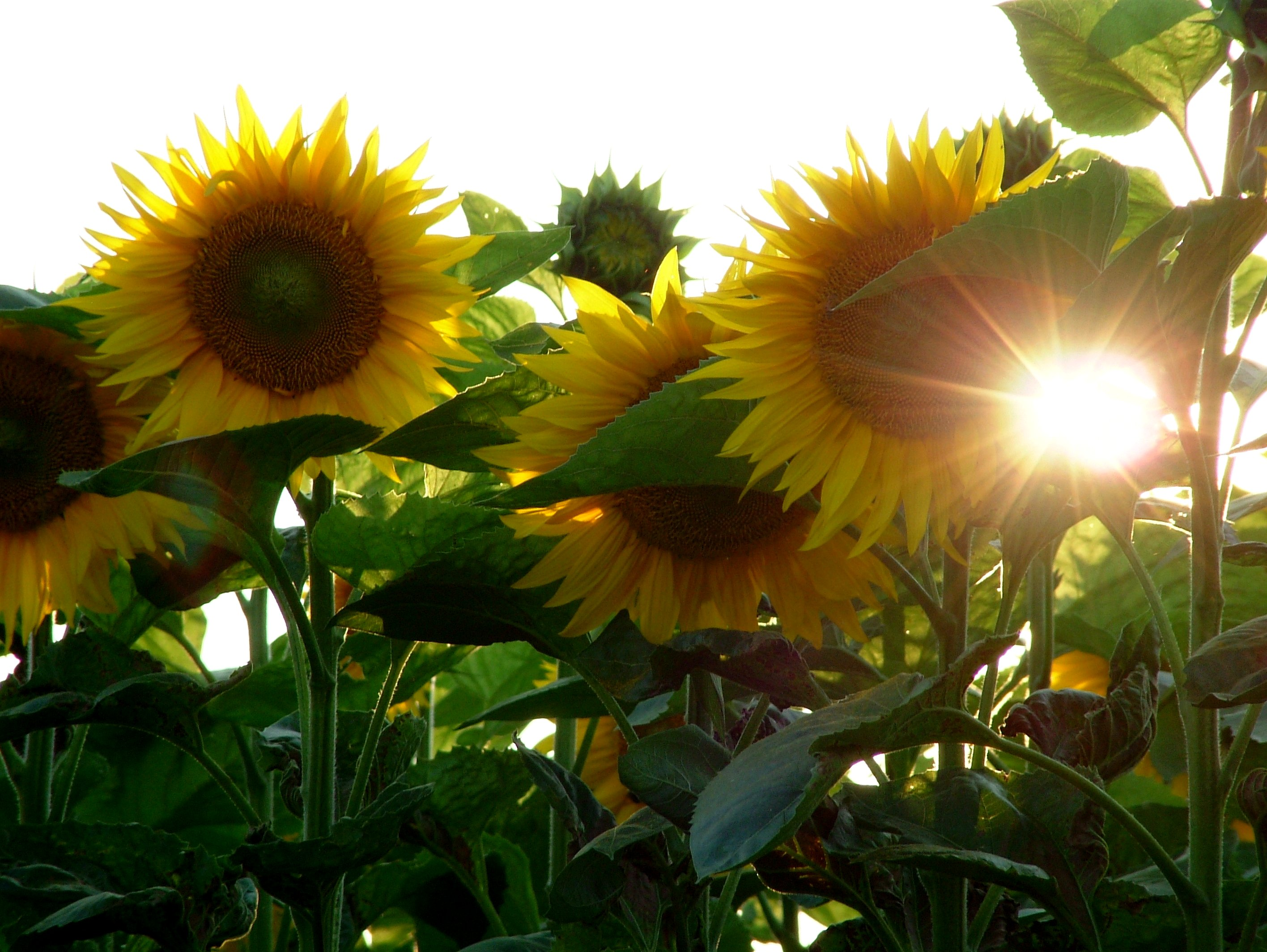
  Sunflowers with the Sun behind them

=== Evolution and ecology ===
- The word theory in "the theory of evolution" does not imply scientific doubt regarding its validity; the concepts of theory and hypothesis have specific meanings in a scientific context. While theory in colloquial usage may denote a hunch or conjecture, a scientific theory is a set of principles that explains an observable phenomenon in natural terms. Scientific facts and theories are not mutually exclusive, and evolution is a theory in the same sense as germ theory or the theory of gravitation.
- The theory of evolution does not attempt to explain the origin of life or the origin and development of the universe. The theory of evolution deals primarily with changes in successive generations over time after life has already originated. The scientific model concerned with the origin of the first organisms from organic or inorganic molecules is known as abiogenesis, and the prevailing theory for explaining the early development of the universe is the Big Bang model.
- Evolution is not a progression from inferior to superior organisms, and it also does not necessarily result in an increase in complexity. Evolution through natural selection only causes successive generations of a population of organisms to become more fit for their environment than previous generations. A population can evolve to become simpler or to have a smaller genome, and atavistic ancestral genetic traits can reappear after having been lost through evolutionary change in previous generations. Biological devolution or de-evolution is a misnomer, not only because it implies that organisms can only evolve backward or forward, but also because it implies that evolution may cause organisms to evolve in the "wrong" direction.
- The phrase "survival of the fittest" refers to biological fitness, not physical fitness. Biological fitness is the quantitative measure of individual reproductive success, e.g. the tendency of lineages containing individuals that produce more offspring in a particular environment to persist and thrive in that environment. Further, while the related concepts of "survival of the fittest" and "natural selection" are often used interchangeably, they are not the same: natural selection is not the only form of selection that determines biological fitness (see sexual selection, fecundity selection, viability selection, and artificial selection).
- Evolution does not "plan" to improve an organism's fitness to survive. This misconception is encouraged as it is common shorthand for biologists to speak of a purpose as a concise form of expression (sometimes called the "metaphor of purpose"); it is less cumbersome to say "Dinosaurs may have evolved feathers for courtship" than "Feathers may have been selected for when they arose as they gave dinosaurs a selective advantage during courtship over their non-feathered rivals". However, this can result in many students explaining evolution as an intentional and purposeful process.
- Mutations are not all equally likely, nor do they occur at the same frequency everywhere in the genome. Certain regions of an organism's genome will be more or less likely to undergo mutation depending on the presence of DNA repair mechanisms and other mutation biases. For instance, in a study on Arabidopsis thaliana, biologically important regions of the plant's genome were found to be protected from mutations, and beneficial mutations were found to be more likely, i.e. mutation was "biased in a way that benefits the plant".
- Mammals did not evolve from any modern group of reptiles; rather, mammals descend from a Reptiliomorph, or reptile-like, ancestor. After the first fully terrestrial tetrapods evolved, one of their lineages split into the synapsids (the line leading to mammals) and the diapsids (the line leading to reptiles, including birds). The synapsids and the diapsids diverged about 320 million years ago, in the mid-Carboniferous period. The mammals themselves are the only survivors of the synapsid line.
- Humans and other apes are Old World monkeys. There is a concerted social and religious effort to deny evidence which connects humans to their ancestors and fellow extant simians, but there is no way to naturally define the monkeys while excluding humans and other apes.
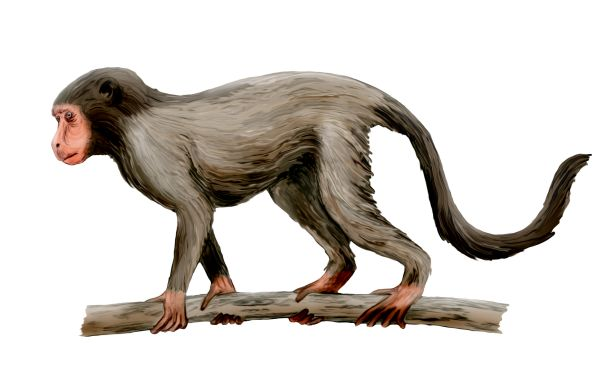
  Aegyptopithecus, a prehistoric monkey predating the split between apes and other Old World monkeys and postdating the division of Old and New World monkeys, making it more closely related to humans than to New World monkeys
- Humans did not evolve from either of the living species of chimpanzees or any other living species of apes. Humans and chimpanzees did, however, evolve from a common ancestor. This most recent common ancestor of living humans and chimpanzees would have lived between 5 and 8 million years ago.
- Humans are biologically animals, despite the fact that the word animal is colloquially used as an antonym for human.
- Ecosystems do not naturally move back towards an equilibrium using negative feedback. The concept of an inherent "balance of nature" has been superseded by chaos theory.

=== Paleontology ===
- Although the word dinosaur can be used pejoratively to describe something that is becoming obsolete due to failing to adapt to changing conditions, non-avian dinosaurs did not become extinct due to being generally maladapted or unable to cope with normal climatic change, a view found in many older textbooks. Moreover, not all dinosaurs are extinct (see below).
- Dinosaurs are not extinct, as birds are classified within the theropod dinosaur lineage. The word dinosaur is commonly used to refer only to non-avian dinosaurs, reflecting an outdated conception of the ancestry of avian dinosaurs, the birds. The evolutionary origin of birds was an open question in paleontology for over a century, but the modern scientific consensus is that birds evolved from small feathered theropods in the Jurassic. Not all dinosaur lineages were cut short at the end of the Cretaceous during the Cretaceous–Paleogene extinction event, and over 11,000 species of avian theropods survive as part of the modern fauna.
- Dinosaurs, pterosaurs, and ichthyosaurs were not cold-blooded. Dinosaur thermoregulation is a topic of ongoing study. However, their high growth rates and the presence of dinosaur fossils in cold polar climates make cold-bloodedness implausible. Pterosaurs are inferred to be warm-blooded because they had a hair-like body covering, a trait absent in modern cold-blooded animals. Estimates of ichthyosaur body temperature are similar to marine mammals in every climate.
- Despite their cultural depictions as "swimming dinosaurs", mosasaurs, ichthyosaurs, plesiosaurs, and other aquatic Mesozoic diapsids were not dinosaurs. Mosasaurs were actually lizards, and ichthyosaurs and plesiosaurs were even more distantly related to dinosaurs. Though some dinosaurs were or are semiaquatic (Hesperornis, Spinosaurus, auks, penguins), none are known to have been fully marine.
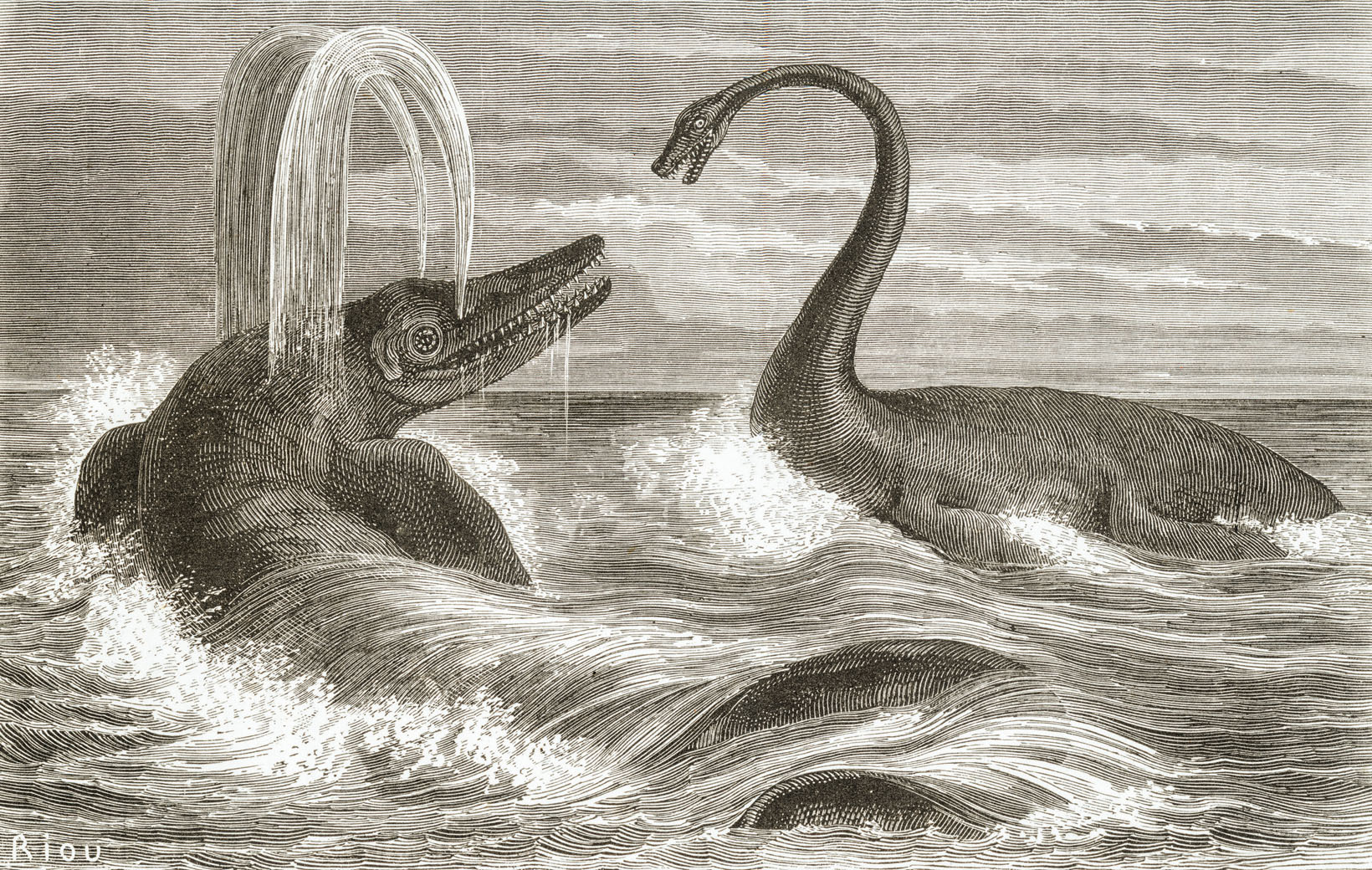
  An ichthyosaur and plesiosaur by Édouard Riou, 1863. This old representation of a plesiosaur lifting its head is not accurate.
- Pterosaurs (informally called pterodactyls) are often called "flying dinosaurs" by popular media and the general public, but while pterosaurs were closely related to dinosaurs, dinosaurs are defined as the descendants of the last common ancestor of the Saurischia and the Ornithischia, which excludes the pterosaurs.
- Dimetrodon is often mistakenly called a dinosaur or considered to be a contemporary of dinosaurs in popular culture, but it became extinct some 40 million years before the first appearance of dinosaurs. Being a synapsid, Dimetrodon is actually more closely related to mammals than to dinosaurs, lizards, or other diapsids.
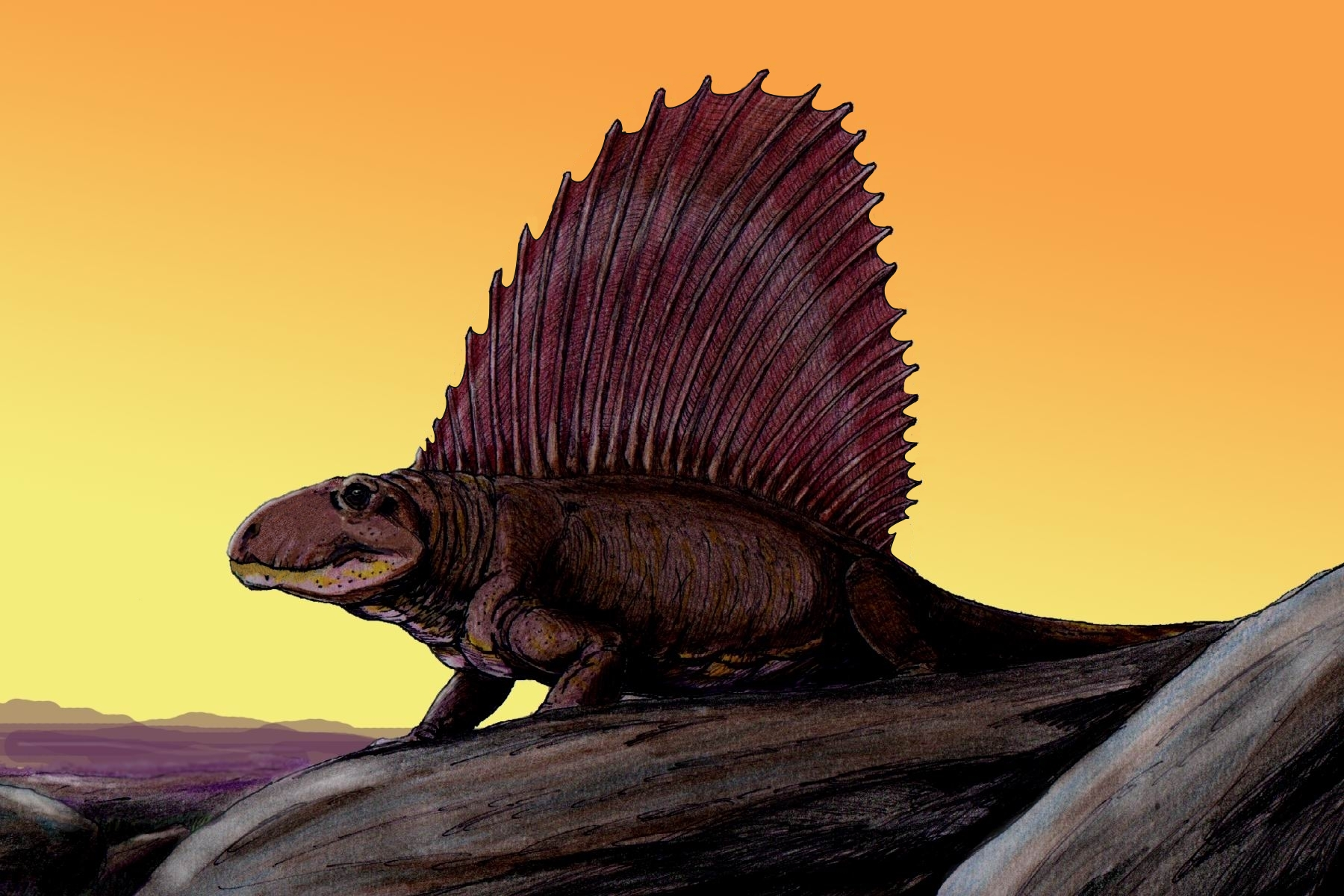
  Dimetrodon, the iconic sail-backed synapsid, was not a dinosaur, nor did it live at the same time as the dinosaurs.
- Humans and non-avian dinosaurs did not coexist at any point, although humans and avian dinosaurs currently coexist. The last of the non-avian dinosaurs died 66 million years ago in the Cretaceous–Paleogene extinction event while the earliest members of the genus Homo (humans) evolved between 2.3 and 2.4 million years ago.
- With the exception of a tiny amount of the world's coal, fossil fuels such as petroleum and coal do not originate from dinosaur fossils. Petroleum is formed when algae and zooplankton die and sink in anoxic conditions to be buried on the ocean floor without being decomposed by aerobic bacteria, and only a tiny amount of the world's deposits of coal contain dinosaur fossils; the vast majority of coal is fossilized plant matter.

== Chemistry and materials science ==
- Himalayan salt does not have lower levels of sodium than conventional table salt.
- Glass does not flow at room temperature as a high-viscosity liquid. Although glass shares some molecular properties with liquids, it is a solid at room temperature and begins to flow only at hundreds of degrees above room temperature. Old glass which is thicker at the bottom than at the top comes from the production process, not from slow flow; no such distortion is observed in other glass objects of similar or even greater age.
- Diamonds are not generally formed from compressed coal. Most natural gem diamonds formed in the conditions of extreme heat and pressure, commonly about 150 to 200 kilometers (93 to 124 mi) below the surface, and were later brought upward by kimberlite eruptions. Coal, by contrast, is a sedimentary deposit formed from buried plant remains, and is unlikely to migrate below 3.2 kilometers (2.0 mi) through geological processes. Because many diamonds are billions of years old, whereas the first land plants appeared much later, coal was not the source material for most natural diamonds.
- Neither "tin" foil nor "tin" cans still use tin as a primary material. Aluminum foil has replaced tin foil in almost all uses since the 20th century; tin cans now primarily use steel or aluminum as their main metal.
- There is no special compound added to the water in swimming pools that will reveal the presence of urine and catch those who urinate in the pool.
- Although the core of a wooden pencil is commonly referred to as "lead", wooden pencils do not contain the chemical element lead, nor have they ever contained it; "black lead" was formerly a name of graphite, which is commonly used for pencil leads.

== Computing and the Internet ==
- The macOS and Linux operating systems are not immune to malware such as trojan horses or computer viruses. Specialized malware designed to attack those systems does exist (see Linux malware). However, the vast majority of viruses are developed for Microsoft Windows due to its larger market share.
- The deep web is not primarily full of pornography, illegal drug trade websites, and stolen bank details. This information is primarily found in a small portion of the deep web known as the "dark web". Much of the deep web consists of academic libraries, databases, and anything that is not indexed by normal search engines, including most private email accounts and direct messages.
- Private browsing (such as Chrome's "Incognito Mode") does not protect users from being tracked by websites, governments, or one's internet service provider (ISP), nor does it hide one's information when using devices or networks owned or maintained by one's employer, school, or other entity, such as a coffee shop. Such entities can still use information such as IP addresses and user accounts to uniquely identify users. Private browsing also does not provide additional protection against viruses or malware. It is usually only a feature to not record browsing and searching history on the browser.
- Submerging a phone in rice after it has suffered from water damage has not been shown to be effective in repairing it. Even if submerging them in a desiccant were more effective than leaving them to dry in open air, common desiccants such as silica gel or cat litter are better than rice.
- Mobile phones do not create considerable electromagnetic interference when used in hospitals.
- The Apple logo was not inspired by Alan Turing or his death by cyanide-laced apple. Although Turing was found dead with a half-eaten apple near his bed in 1954 and was a key figure in computing history, Apple's logo designer Rob Janoff has repeatedly denied any connection.

== Earth and environmental sciences ==
Global surface temperature reconstruction over the last 2000 years using proxy data from tree rings, corals, and ice cores in blue. Directly observed data is in red.

- Contemporary global warming is driven by human activities, despite claims that it is not occurring, lacks strong scientific consensus, or that warming is mostly caused by non-human factors. No scientific body of national or international standing disagrees with the decades-old, near-complete scientific consensus on climate change. Global warming is primarily a result of the increase in atmospheric greenhouse gas concentrations (like CO_{2} and methane) via the burning of fossil fuels as well as other human activities such as deforestation, with secondary climate change feedback mechanisms (such as the melting of the polar ice increasing the Earth's absorption of sunlight) assisting to perpetuate the change.
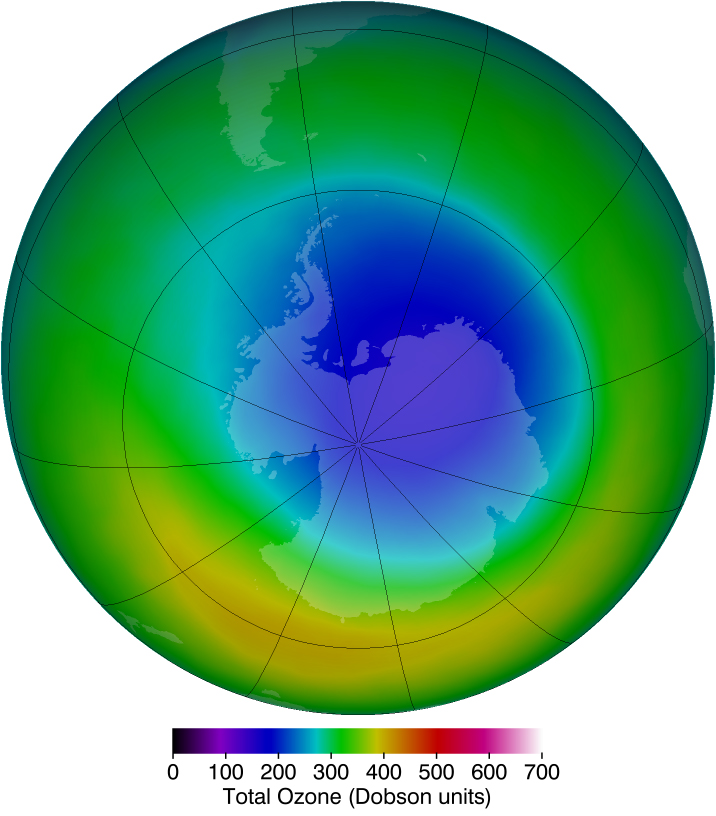
- Ozone depletion is not a cause of global warming.
  Global warming is not caused by the hole in the ozone layer. Ozone depletion is a separate problem caused by chlorofluorocarbons (CFCs) which have been released into the atmosphere. CFCs are strong greenhouse gases; however, the hole in the ozone layer is shrinking and in 2019 was the smallest it had been since 1982, while global warming continues.
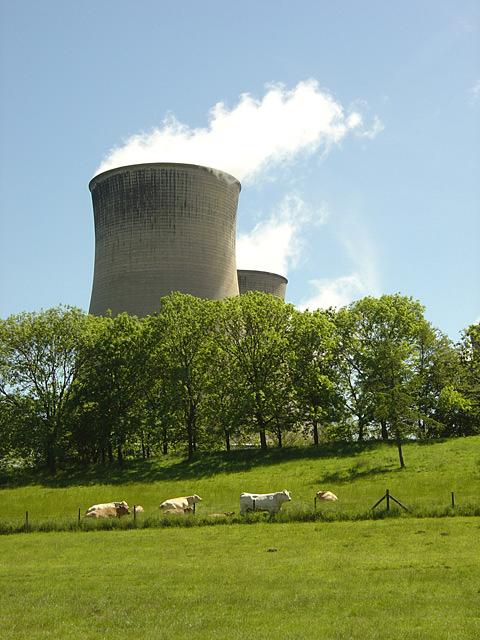
- Cooling towers from a coal-fired power plant. The white clouds are harmless water vapor from the cooling process.
  Cooling towers in power stations and other facilities do not emit smoke, harmful fumes, or radiation; they emit water vapor and do not contribute to climate change.
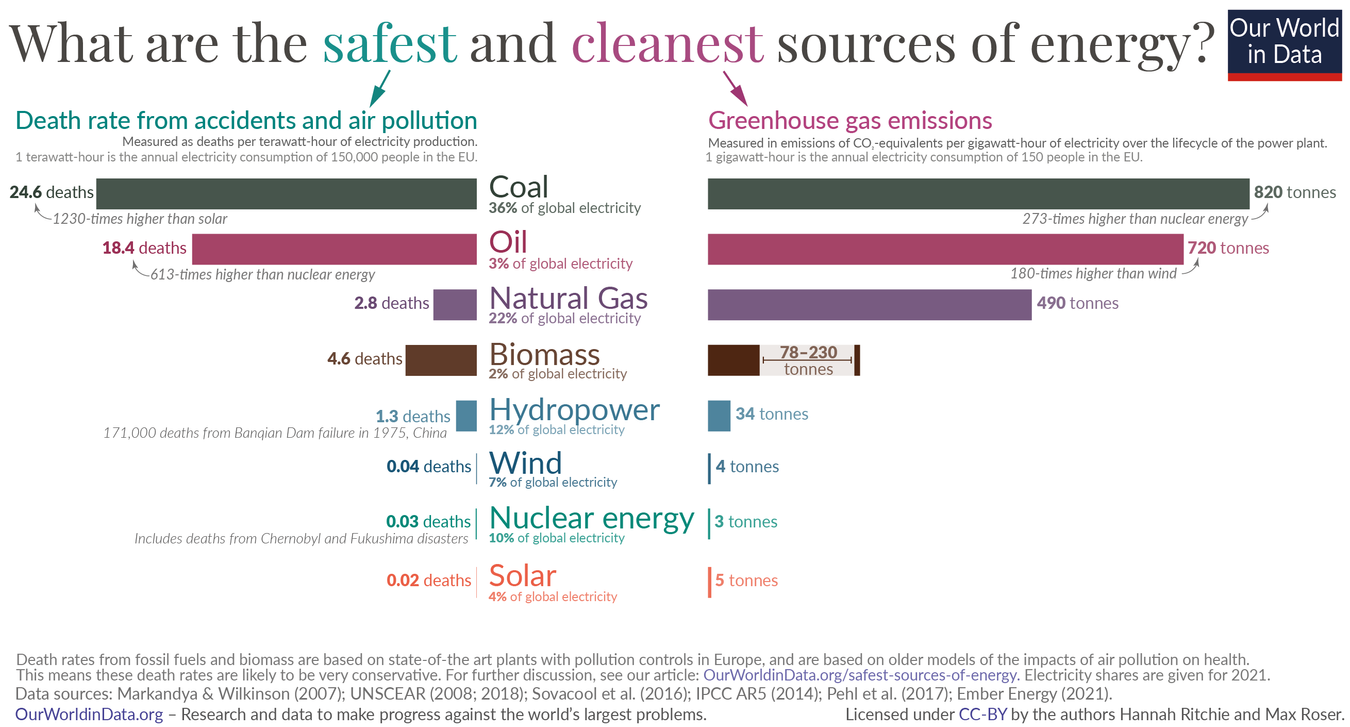
- Death rates from air pollution and accidents related to energy production, measured in deaths per terawatt hours (TWh) (left). Carbon emissions measured in tons per gigawatt hour (GWh) (right).
  Nuclear power is one of the safest sources of energy, resulting in orders of magnitude fewer deaths than conventional power sources per unit of energy produced. Extremely few people are killed or injured due to nuclear power on a yearly basis. (See also: Radiophobia)
- Earthquake strength (or magnitude) is not commonly measured using the Richter scale. Although the Richter scale was used historically to measure earthquake magnitude (not earthquake damage), it was found in the 1970s that it does not reliably represent the magnitude of large earthquakes. It has therefore been largely replaced by the moment magnitude scale, although very small earthquakes are still sometimes measured using the Richter scale. Nevertheless, earthquake magnitude is still widely misattributed to the Richter scale.
- Lightning can, and often does, strike the same place twice. Lightning in a thunderstorm is more likely to strike objects and spots that are more prominent or conductive. For instance, lightning strikes the Empire State Building in New York City on average 23 times per year.
- Heat lightning does not exist as a distinct phenomenon. What is mistaken for "heat lightning" is usually ordinary lightning from storms too distant to hear the associated thunder.
- The Yellowstone Caldera is not overdue for a supervolcano eruption. There is also no evidence that it will erupt in the near future. In fact, data indicates there will not be an eruption in the coming centuries. The most likely eruption would be hydrothermal rather than volcanic. A caldera-forming volcanic eruption (and subsequent impacts on global weather patterns and agricultural production) is the least likely scenario and has an extremely low likelihood.
- The Earth's interior is not molten rock. This misconception may originate from a misunderstanding based on the fact that the Earth's mantle convects, and the incorrect assumption that only liquids and gases can convect. In fact, a solid with a large Rayleigh number can also convect, given enough time, which is what occurs in the solid mantle due to the very large thermal gradient across it. There are small pockets of molten rock in the upper mantle, but these make up a tiny fraction of the mantle's volume. The Earth's outer core is liquid, but it is liquid metal, not rock.
- The Amazon rainforest does not provide 20% of Earth's oxygen. This is a misinterpretation of a 2010 study which found that approximately 34% of photosynthesis by terrestrial plants occurs in tropical rainforests (so the Amazon rainforest would account for approximately half of this). Due to respiration by the resident organisms, all ecosystems (including the Amazon rainforest) have a net output of oxygen of approximately zero. The oxygen currently present in the atmosphere was accumulated over billions of years.
- Bird deaths due to wind turbines are extremely rare compared to those caused by cats, windows, vehicles, poison, and overhead power lines.
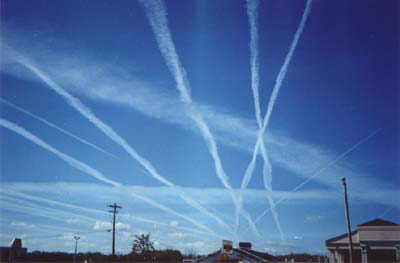
- Multiple concurrent contrails. How long they last depends upon the weather, especially the temperature, humidity, and wind speed.
  The white streaks seen in the sky after airplanes pass overhead are contrails consisting of condensed water vapor and engine exhaust. They are not chemtrails, nor are they part of a program to control the weather or some other nefarious purpose.

== Economics ==
Total population living in extreme poverty, by world region 1987 to 2015

- The total number of people living in extreme poverty globally decreased by two-thirds from 1990 to 2025 (measured using the international poverty line), with other poverty measurements showing similar trends. However, most people surveyed in several countries incorrectly think it has increased or stayed the same.
- Although the human population of Earth is increasing, the rate of human population growth is decreasing and the world population is expected to peak and then begin falling during the 21st century. Improvements in agricultural productivity and technology are expected to be able to meet anticipated increased demand for resources, making a global human overpopulation scenario unlikely.
- For any given production set, there is not a set amount of labor input (a "lump of labor") to produce that output. This fallacy is commonly seen in Luddite and later, related movements as an argument either that automation causes permanent, structural unemployment, or that labor-limiting regulation can decrease unemployment. In fact, changes in capital allocation, efficiency, and economies of learning can change the amount of labor input for a given set of production.
- Income is not a direct factor in determining credit score in the United States. Rather, credit score is affected by the amount of unused available credit, which is in turn affected by income. Income is also considered when evaluating creditworthiness more generally.
- The US public vastly overestimates the amount spent on foreign aid.
- In the US, an increase in gross income will never reduce a taxpayer's post-tax earnings (net income) by putting them in a higher tax bracket. Tax brackets specify marginal tax rates: only income earned in the higher tax bracket is taxed at the higher rate. An increase in gross income can reduce net income in a welfare trap, however, when benefits are withdrawn when passing a certain income threshold. Prevalence of the misconception varies by political party affiliation.
- Constructing new housing decreases the cost of rent and the price of homes in both the immediate neighborhood and in the city as a whole. In real estate economics, "supply skepticism" leads many Americans to misunderstand the effect of increasing the supply of housing on housing costs. The misconception is unique to the housing market.
- Businesses do not get a tax benefit by collecting charitable donations from their customers. Corporation taxes are based on profit; the customer's donation would not change the amount of profit and therefore the tax payable. A business would need to donate its own money to receive a tax break.
- Import tariffs are taxes paid to the government by importers, not by exporting countries or manufacturers as is claimed by some, including Donald Trump. There is a near-unanimous consensus among economists that tariffs have a net-negative effect on economic growth and welfare, and harm consumers through higher prices by more than they benefit domestic producers and governments.

== Geography ==
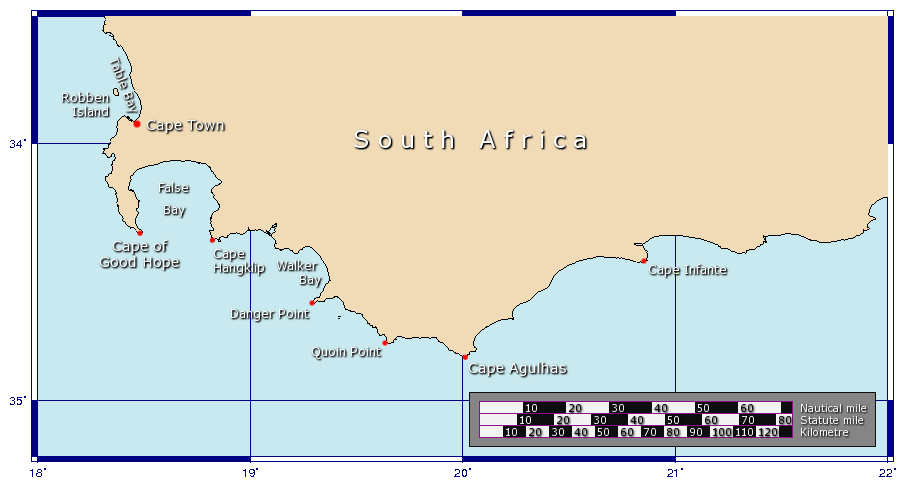
The Cape of Good Hope and Cape Agulhas, the southernmost point of Africa

- The Cape of Good Hope is not the southern tip of Africa; that distinction belongs to Cape Agulhas, located about 150 kilometres (90 mi) to the east-southeast.
- The majority of the Sahara consists of rocks, rather than sand.
- Rivers do not predominantly flow from north to south. Rivers flow downhill in all compass directions, often changing direction along their course. Many major rivers flow northward, including the Nile, the Yenisey, the Ob, the Rhine, the Lena, and the Orinoco.

== Human body and health ==
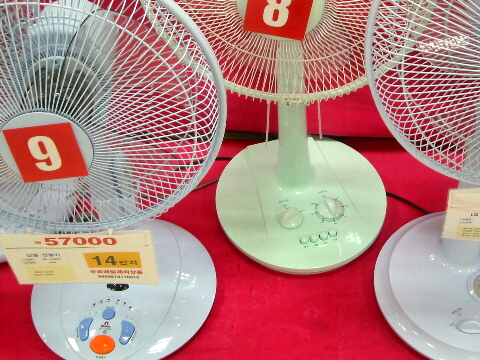
Leaving electric fans on while asleep is not dangerous.

- It is not just heavy metals which can be toxic; other metals (for example beryllium and lithium) can be toxic too.
- Sleeping in a closed room with an electric fan running does not result in "fan death", as is widely believed in South Korea among older people. As of 2019, this belief was in decline.
- Nocturia (waking up at night to urinate) is equally prevalent in women and men, although it is more common among those over 50.
- Waking up a sleepwalker does not harm them. Sleepwalkers may be confused or disoriented for a short time after awakening, but the health risks associated with sleepwalking are from injury or insomnia, not from being awakened.
- Seizures cannot cause a person to swallow their own tongue, and it is dangerous to attempt to place a foreign object into a convulsing person's mouth. Instead it is recommended to gently lay a convulsing person on their side to minimize the risk of asphyxiation.
- Drowning is often inconspicuous to onlookers. In most cases, the instinctive drowning response prevents the victim from waving or yelling, which are therefore not dependable signs of trouble. Most drowning victims do not show prior evidence of distress.
- Herbal medicines are not necessarily safe and side-effect free; such medicines can have adverse effects.
- Human blood in veins is not actually blue. Blood is red due to the presence of hemoglobin; deoxygenated blood (in veins) has a deep red color, and oxygenated blood (in arteries) has a light cherry-red color. Veins below the skin can appear blue or green due to subsurface scattering of light through the skin, and aspects of human color perception. Many medical diagrams also use blue to show veins, and red to show arteries, which contributes to this misconception.
- Asystole, also known as a "flatline", is not a shockable rhythm and is neither treated nor cured via defibrillation. Medical interventions for asystole include high-quality CPR and (in a medically professional environment) epinephrine administration. The misconception may stem from outdated medical practices and Hollywood glamorization of resuscitation efforts.
- Exposure to a vacuum, or experiencing all but the most extreme uncontrolled decompression, does not cause the body to explode or internal fluids to boil (although the fluids in the mouth and lungs will indeed boil at altitudes above the Armstrong limit); rather, it will lead to a loss of consciousness once the body has depleted the supply of oxygen in the blood, followed by death from hypoxia within minutes.
- Exercise-induced delayed onset muscle soreness is not caused by lactic acid build-up. Muscular lactic acid levels return to normal levels within an hour after exercise; delayed onset muscle soreness is thought to be due to microtrauma from unaccustomed or strenuous exercise.
- Stretching before or after exercise does not reduce delayed onset muscle soreness.
- Urine is not sterile, not even in the bladder. This misconception may derive from urine bacterial screening tests, which return "negative" when bacteria levels are low, but nonzero.
- Sudden immersion into freezing water does not typically cause death by hypothermia, but rather from the cold shock response, which can cause cardiac arrest, heart attack, or hyperventilation leading to drowning.
- Cremated remains are not ashes in the usual sense. After the incineration is completed, the dry bone fragments are swept out of the retort and pulverized by a machine called a cremulator (essentially a high-capacity, high-speed blender) to process them into "ashes" or "cremated remains".

The alveoli

- The lung's alveoli are not tiny balloons that expand and contract under positive pressure following the Young–Laplace equation, as is taught in some physiology and medical textbooks. The tissue structure is more like a sponge with polygonal spaces that unfold and fold under negative pressure from the chest wall.
- Half of body heat is not lost through the head, and covering the head is no more effective at preventing heat loss than covering any other portion of the body. Heat is lost from the body in proportion to the amount of exposed skin. The head accounts for around 7–9% of the body's surface, and studies have shown that having one's head submerged in cold water causes a person to lose only 10% more heat overall.
- Adrenochrome is not harvested from living people and has no use as a recreational drug. Hunter S. Thompson conceived a fictional drug of the same name in his book Fear and Loathing in Las Vegas, apparently unaware that a real substance by that name existed; it is Thompson's fictional adrenochrome, and not the real chemical compound, that is the source of numerous conspiracy theories revolving around human trafficking to harvest the fictional drug.
- Men and women have the same number of ribs: 24, or 12 pairs. The erroneous idea that women have one more rib than men may stem from the biblical creation story of Adam and Eve.
- The use of cotton swabs (a.k.a. cotton buds or Q-Tips) in the ear canal has no associated medical benefits and poses definite medical risks.
- The idea that a precise number of stages of grief exists is not supported in peer-reviewed research or objective clinical observation, let alone the five stages of grief model.
- 37 °C (98.6 °F) is not the normal or average temperature of the human body. That figure comes from an 1860 study, but modern research shows that the average internal temperature is 36.4 °C (97.5 °F), with small fluctuations.
- The cells in the human body are not outnumbered 10 to 1 by microorganisms. The 10 to 1 ratio was an estimate made in 1972; current estimates put the ratio at either 3 to 1 or 1.3 to 1.
- The total length of capillaries in the human body is not 100,000 km. That figure comes from a 1929 book by August Krogh, who used an unrealistically large model person and an inaccurately high density of capillaries. The true number is believed to be between 9,000 and 19,000 km.
- Wood smoke, for example from wood-burning stoves, is not a benign form of pollution because it is "natural", but is as harmful as other common forms of air pollution such as diesel fumes.

=== Disease and preventive healthcare ===
- It is not true that more people have died from the COVID-19 vaccine than from COVID-19 itself. Severe adverse reactions from the vaccine are rare, and an "exceedingly small" number of deaths have been caused by the vaccine. Meanwhile, the death toll from the disease itself is in the millions.
- Tuberculosis is not purely a disease of the lungs that has symptoms of coughing. It may instead infect a wide range of other organs in the body.
- Cancer cannot be treated by restricting food intake and so supposedly "starving" tumors. Rather, the health of people with cancer is best served by maintaining a healthy diet.
- The common cold and the common flu are caused by viruses, not exposure to cold temperatures. However, low temperatures may somewhat weaken the immune system, and someone already infected with a cold or influenza virus but showing no symptoms can become symptomatic after they are exposed to low temperatures. Viruses are more likely to spread during the winter for a variety of reasons such as dry air, less air circulation in homes, people spending more time indoors, and lower vitamin D levels in humans.
- Antibiotics will not cure a cold; they treat bacterial diseases and are ineffectual against viruses. However, they are sometimes prescribed to prevent or treat secondary infections.
- There is little to no evidence that any illnesses are curable through essential oils or aromatherapy, and fish oil has not been shown to cure dementia.
- In those with the common cold, the color of the sputum or nasal secretion may vary from colorless to yellow to green and does not indicate the class of agent causing the infection. The color of the sputum is determined by immune cells fighting an infection in the nasal area.
- Vitamin C does not prevent or treat the common cold, although it may have a protective effect during intense cold-weather exercise. If taken daily, it may slightly reduce the duration and severity of colds, but it has no effect if taken after the cold starts.
- Hand-washing temperature is purely preferential; cold and warm water remove the same amount of germs when using hand soap. To kill germs, water would have to be hot enough to scald one’s hands.
- Supplements of the plant echinacea do not prevent or reduce the severity of colds as widely believed. A 2014 review of 24 different randomized controlled trials found echinacea supplements do not prevent colds, with most showing no benefit over placebo.

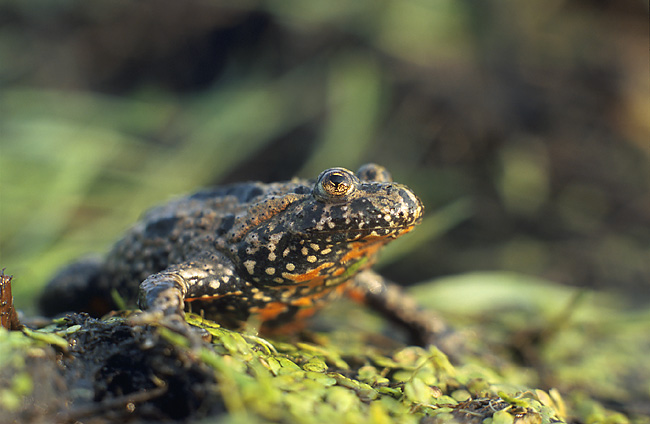
The bumps on a toad are not warts and cannot cause warts on humans.

- Humans cannot catch warts from toads or other animals; the bumps on a toad are not warts. Warts on human skin are caused by human papillomavirus, which is known to affect only humans.
- Cracking one's knuckles does not cause osteoarthritis.
- In people with eczema, bathing does not dry the skin as long as a moisturizer is applied soon after. If moisturizer is not applied after bathing, then the evaporation of water from the skin can result in dryness.
- There have never been any programs in the US that provide access to dialysis machines in exchange for pull tabs on beverage cans. This rumor has existed since at least the 1970s, and usually cites the National Kidney Foundation as the organization offering the program. The Foundation itself has denied the rumor, noting that dialysis machines are primarily funded by Medicare.
- Rhinoceros horn in powdered form is not used as an aphrodisiac in traditional Chinese medicine as Cornu Rhinoceri Asiatici (犀角, xījiǎo, "rhinoceros horn"). It is prescribed for fevers and convulsions, a treatment not supported by evidence-based medicine.
- Leprosy is not auto-degenerative as commonly supposed, meaning that it will not (on its own) cause body parts to be damaged or fall off. Leprosy causes rashes to form and may degrade cartilage and, if untreated, inflame tissue. In addition, leprosy is only mildly contagious, partly because 95% of those infected with the mycobacteria that cause leprosy do not develop the disease. Tzaraath, a Biblical disease that disfigures the skin, is often identified as leprosy, and may be the source of many myths about the disease.
- Rust itself does not cause tetanus infection. The bacterium that causes tetanus thrives in low oxygen environments, including rust where the oxygen has combined with iron, so many people associate rust with tetanus. However, any puncture wound can introduce spores that cause a tetanus infection, not just rusty nails.
- Quarantine has never been a standard procedure for those with severe combined immunodeficiency, despite the condition's popular nickname ("bubble boy syndrome") and its portrayal in films. A bone marrow transplant in the earliest months of life is the standard course of treatment. The exceptional case of David Vetter, who lived much of his life encased in a sterile environment because he would not receive a transplant until age 12, was an inspiration for the "bubble boy" trope.
- Post-exposure prophylaxis for rabies does not require a painful series of injections into the abdomen with a long needle. Prior to the 1980s, the rabies vaccine did indeed require injection into the abdomen, but modern rabies vaccines are given as intramuscular injections into the deltoid muscle of the upper arm.
- Statements in medication package inserts listing the frequency of side effects describe how often the effect occurs after taking a drug, but are not making any assertion that there is a causal connection between taking the drug and the occurrence of the side effect. In other words, what is being reported on is correlation, not necessarily causation.
- There is no peer-reviewed scientific evidence that crystal healing has any effect beyond acting as a placebo.
- There is a scientific consensus that currently available food derived from genetically modified crops poses no greater risk to human health than conventional food.
- Reading in dim light causes eye strain rather than permanent damage to the eye.
- Color blindness cannot be significantly alleviated by glasses or lenses. While there are lenses marketed towards the colorblind, their efficacy is doubted by professionals, and they do not enable wearers to see new colors.
- A fever from infection does not cause brain damage by itself. The myth has been linked to the association between fevers and typically non-serious febrile seizures.
- Tourette's syndrome is not predominantly characterised by the compulsive or frequent use of profanity or taboo words and phrases (coprolalia), as it is commonly misunderstood to be. Only approximately 10% of people with Tourette's exhibit coprolalia at all, and most Tourette's tics (which can be physical or verbal) often go unnoticed by casual observers.
- The Hippocratic Oath does not begin, "First do no harm" (Primum non nocere), nor is the word "First" present in the original text. Physicians taking the Hippocratic Oath vow, however, to "abstain from all intentional wrong-doing and harm".
- There is no link between vaccines and SIDS (Sudden Infant Death Syndrome). The misconception might be because 2 to 4 months is the peak age for SIDS and also a period when children receive several vaccines.

=== Nutrition, food, and drink ===
- Diet has little influence on the body's detoxification, and there is no evidence that detoxification diets rid the body of toxins. Toxins are metabolized and removed from the bloodstream by the liver and kidneys, and they are primarily removed from the body in urine and bile (excreted with the feces).
- Drinking milk or consuming other dairy products does not increase mucus production. As a result, they do not need to be avoided by those with the flu or cold congestion. However, milk and saliva in one's mouth mix to create a thick liquid that can briefly coat the mouth and throat. The sensation that lingers may be mistaken for increased phlegm.
- Drinking eight glasses (2–3 liters) of water a day is not needed to maintain health. The amount of water needed varies by person, weight, diet, activity level, clothing, and the ambient temperature and humidity. Water requirements can be met from liquids such as juices, tea, milk, soups, etc., and from foods including fruits and vegetables.
- Drinking coffee and other caffeinated beverages does not cause dehydration for regular drinkers, although it can for occasional drinkers.
- Eating disorders do not exclusively affect women; women are merely more likely than men to suffer from eating disorders.
- Neither spicy food nor coffee has a significant effect on the development of peptic ulcers.
- Sugar does not cause clinical hyperactivity in children. Double-blind trials have shown no difference in behavior between children given sugar-full or sugar-free diets, even in studies specifically looking at children with attention deficit hyperactivity disorder or those considered sensitive to sugar. A 2019 meta-analysis found no positive effect of sugar consumption on mood but did find an association with lower alertness and increased fatigue within an hour of consumption, known as a sugar crash. Sugar can, however, lead to a jump in blood sugar levels, and may make a child more active even if it does not cause clinical hyperactivity.
- Eating nuts, popcorn, or seeds does not increase the risk of diverticulitis. These foods may actually have a protective effect.
- Eating less than an hour before swimming does not significantly increase the risk of experiencing muscle cramps, and does not increase the risk of drowning. One study shows a correlation between alcohol consumption and drowning, but not between eating and stomach cramps.
- Vegan and vegetarian diets can provide enough protein for adequate nutrition. In fact, typical protein intakes of ovo-lacto vegetarians meet or exceed requirements. The American Dietetic Association maintains that appropriately planned vegetarian diets are healthful. However, a vegan diet does require dietary supplements.
- Swallowed chewing gum does not take seven years to digest. Chewing gum is mostly indigestible, and passes through the digestive system at the same rate as other matter.
- The beta carotene in carrots does not enhance night vision beyond normal levels for people receiving an adequate amount, only in those with a deficiency of vitamin A.
- Spinach is not a particularly good source of dietary iron. While it does contain more iron than many vegetables such as asparagus, Swiss chard, kale, or arugula, it contains only about one-third to one-fifth of the iron in lima beans, chickpeas, apricots, or wheat germ. Additionally, the non-heme iron found in spinach and other vegetables is not as readily absorbed as the heme iron found in meats and fish.
- Most cases of obesity are not related to slower resting metabolism. Resting metabolic rate does not vary much between people. Overweight people tend to underestimate the amount of food they eat, and underweight people tend to overestimate. In fact, overweight people tend to have faster metabolic rates due to the increased energy required by the larger body.
- Eating normal amounts of soy does not cause hormonal imbalance.
- There is no good evidence that low-carbohydrate diets have any health benefits besides weight loss, for which they are about as effective as other diets. Weight loss is primarily a result of caloric restriction, and is not significantly influenced by the balance between fat and carbohydrate in one's diet.
- Monosodium glutamate has not been proven to cause any negative health effects.

==== Alcohol ====
- Alcoholic beverages do not make the entire body warmer. Alcoholic drinks create the sensation of warmth because they cause blood vessels to dilate and stimulate nerve endings near the surface of the skin with an influx of warm blood. This can actually result in making the core body temperature lower, as it allows for easier heat exchange with a cold external environment.
- Alcohol does not necessarily kill brain cells. Alcohol can, however, lead indirectly to the death of brain cells in two ways. First, in chronic, heavy alcohol users whose brains have adapted to the effects of alcohol, abrupt ceasing following heavy use can cause excitotoxicity leading to cellular death in multiple areas of the brain. Second, in alcoholics who get most of their daily calories from alcohol, a deficiency of thiamine can produce Korsakoff's syndrome, which is associated with serious brain damage.
- The order in which different types of alcoholic beverages are consumed ("Grape or grain but never the twain" and "Beer before liquor never sicker; liquor before beer in the clear") does not affect hangover severity.
- Authentic absinthe has no hallucinogenic properties, and is no more dangerous than any other alcoholic beverage of equivalent proof. This misconception stems from late-19th- and early-20th-century distillers who produced cheap knockoff versions of absinthe, which used copper salts to recreate the distinct green color of true absinthe, and some also reportedly adulterated cheap absinthe with poisonous antimony trichloride, reputed to enhance the louche effect.

=== Sexuality and reproduction ===
- Older adults are not necessarily sexually inactive nor have they lost interest in sex; although the frequency of sexual activity tends to decline with age. One survey in England of people aged 60–69 recorded 86% of men and 60% of women as sexually active.
- It is not possible to get pregnant from semen released in a commercial swimming pool without penetration. The sperm cells would be quickly killed by the chlorinated water and would not survive long enough to reach the vagina.
- An examination of the hymen is not an accurate or reliable indicator one has had penetrative sex; the tearing of the hymen may have been the result of some other event, and some are born without one. Virginity tests, such as the "two-finger" test, are unscientific.
- Hand size and foot size do not correlate with human penis size, but finger length ratio may.
- While pregnancies from sex between first cousins do carry a slightly elevated risk of birth defects, this risk is often exaggerated. The risk is 5–6% (similar to that of a woman in her early 40s giving birth), compared with a baseline risk of 3–4%. The effects of inbreeding depression, while still relatively small compared to other factors (and thus difficult to control for in a scientific experiment), become more noticeable if isolated and maintained for several generations.
- Having sex before a sporting event or contest is not physiologically detrimental to performance. In fact some studies suggest that sex prior to sports activity can elevate male testosterone levels (which could potentially enhance performance for male athletes), while long periods of abstinence can reduce those levels.
- The heightened sensitivity some experience at the vaginal G-spot is not due to it being a distinct anatomical structure, but rather because pressure in that area may stimulate other internal structures, notably the Skene's gland. Many sexologists take issue with the term, concerned that women who "fail to find their G-spot" may feel abnormal.
- The menstrual cycles of those who live together do not tend to synchronize. A 1971 study made this claim, but subsequent research has not supported it.
- Having an abortion does not increase someone's risk of developing breast cancer. Some smaller, less reliable early studies suggested that abortion could be linked to breast cancer, but the scientific community has concluded that abortion does not cause breast cancer.
- There is no evidence that English-speaking Christian missionaries encouraged converts to use the missionary position in the colonial era. This notion probably originated from Alfred Kinsey's Sexual Behavior in the Human Male (1948) through misunderstandings and misinterpretations of historical documents.

=== Skin and hair ===
- Water-induced wrinkles are not caused by the skin absorbing water and swelling. They are caused by the autonomic nervous system, which triggers localized vasoconstriction in response to wet skin, yielding a wrinkled appearance.
- A person's hair and fingernails do not continue to grow after death. Rather, the skin dries and shrinks away from the bases of hairs and nails, giving the appearance of growth.
- Shaving does not cause terminal hair to grow back thicker or darker. This belief is thought to be due to the fact that hair that has never been cut has a tapered end, so after cutting, the base of the hair is blunt and appears thicker and feels coarser. The fact that short hairs are less flexible than longer hairs contributes to this effect.
- MC1R, the gene mostly responsible for red hair, is not becoming extinct, nor will the gene for blond hair do so, although both alleles are recessive. Redheads and blonds may become rarer but will not die out unless everyone who carries those alleles dies without passing their hair color genes on to their children.
- Acne is not caused by a lack of hygiene or eating fatty foods, though certain medications or a carbohydrate-rich diet may worsen it.
- Dandruff is not caused by poor hygiene, though infrequent hair-washing can make it more obvious. The exact causes of dandruff are uncertain, but they are believed to be mostly genetic and environmental factors.

== Inventions ==
- James Watt did not invent the steam engine, nor were his ideas on steam engine power inspired by a kettle lid pressured open by steam. Watt improved upon the already commercially successful Newcomen atmospheric engine (invented in 1712 by Thomas Newcomen) in the 1760s and 1770s, making certain improvements critical to its future usage; his new steam engine later gained huge fame as a result.
- Although the guillotine was named after the French physician Joseph-Ignace Guillotin, he neither invented nor was executed with this device. He died peacefully in his own bed in 1814. Rather, it was Guillotin's speech favoring beheadings over other forms of execution that led to the device being referred to as "La machine Guillotine" and later simply guillotine.
- Thomas Crapper did not invent the flush toilet. A forerunner of the modern toilet was invented by the Elizabethan courtier Sir John Harington in the 16th century, and in 1775 the Scottish mechanic Alexander Cumming developed and patented a design for a toilet with an S-trap and flushing mechanism. Crapper, however, did much to increase the popularity of the flush toilet and introduced several innovations in the late 19th century, holding nine patents, including one for the floating ballcock.
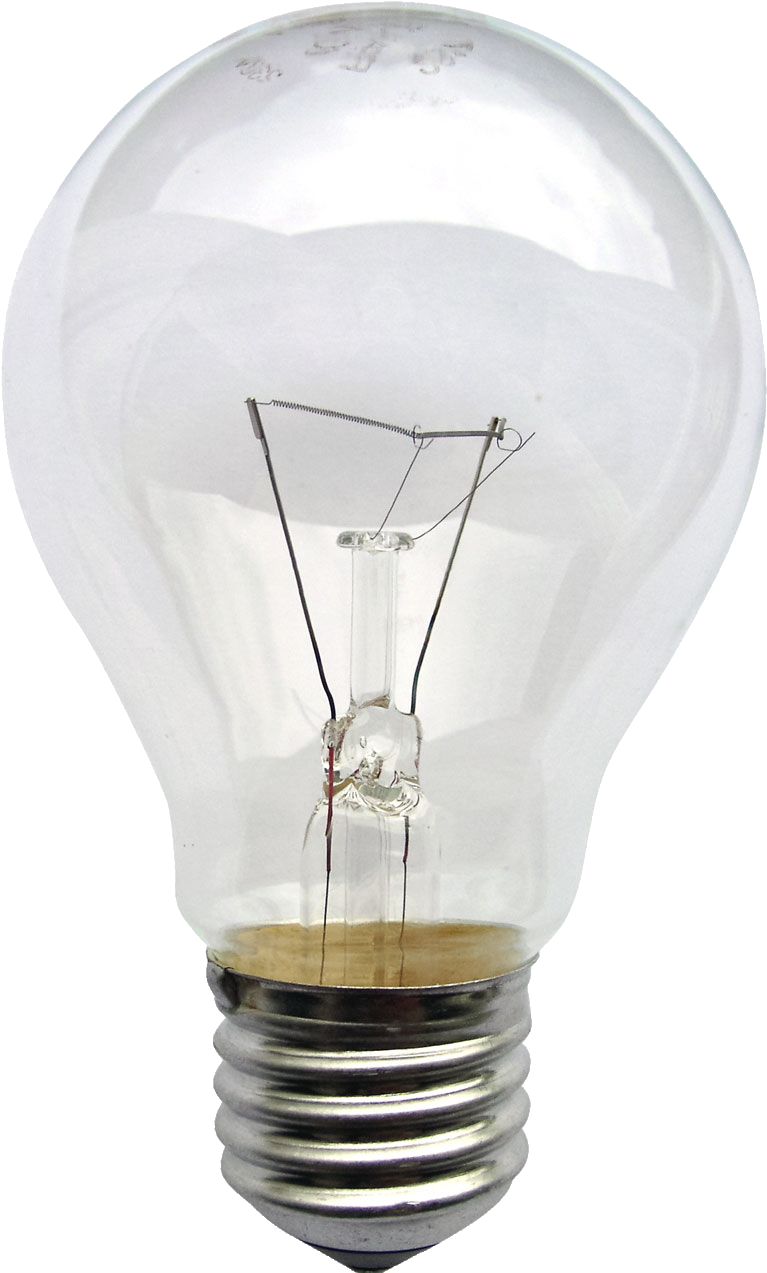
- A 230-volt incandescent light bulb
  Thomas Edison did not invent the light bulb. The team of inventors Edison employed at his laboratories in Menlo Park, New Jersey did, however, develop the first practical light bulb in 1880 (employing a carbonized bamboo filament), shortly prior to Joseph Swan, who invented an even more efficient bulb in 1881 (which used a cellulose filament).
- Henry Ford did not invent either the automobile or the assembly line. He did improve the assembly line process substantially, sometimes through his own engineering but more often through sponsoring the work of his employees, and he was the main person behind the introduction of the Model T, regarded as the first affordable automobile. Karl Benz (co-founder of Mercedes-Benz) is credited with the invention of the first modern automobile, and the assembly line has existed throughout history.
- Al Gore never said that he had "invented" the Internet. What Gore actually said was, "During my service in the United States Congress, I took the initiative in creating the Internet", in reference to his political work towards developing the Internet for widespread public use. Gore was the original drafter of the High Performance Computing and Communication Act of 1991, which provided significant funding for supercomputing centers, and this in turn led to upgrades of a major part of the already-existing early 1990s Internet backbone, the NSFNet, and development of NCSA Mosaic, the browser that popularized the World Wide Web. (See also: Al Gore and information technology)
- Kodak did not refuse to invest in digital cameras, but was rather a pioneer in the field, and at one point was the market leader in digital camera sales in the United States.

== Mathematics ==
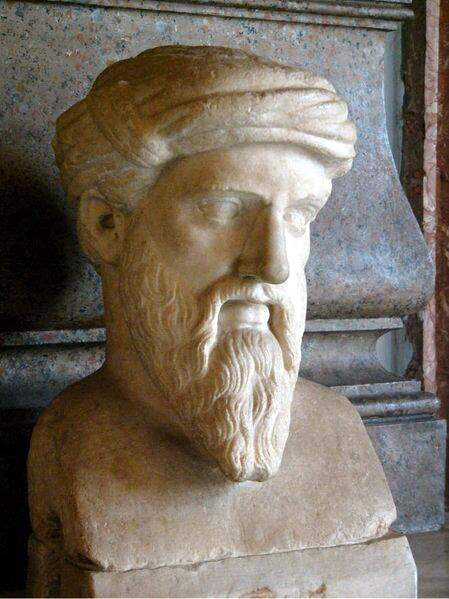
Classical historians dispute whether Pythagoras made any mathematical discoveries.

- Hindu-Arabic numerals were not originally designed to indicate their numeric value through the number of angles they contain. There are no historical records of this, and the myth is difficult to reconcile with digits past 3 or 4.
- The Greek philosopher Pythagoras was not the first to discover what is now called the Pythagorean theorem, as it was known and used by the Babylonians and Indians centuries before him. Pythagoras may have been the first to introduce it to the Greeks, but the first record of it being mathematically proven as a theorem is in Euclid's Elements which was published some 200 years after Pythagoras.
- There is no evidence that the ancient Greeks deliberately designed the Parthenon to match the golden ratio. The Parthenon was completed in 438 BCE, more than a century before the first recorded mention of the ratio by Euclid. Similarly, Leonardo da Vinci's Vitruvian Man makes no mention of the golden ratio in its text, although it describes many other proportions.
- The repeating decimal written as 0.999... represents exactly the same quantity as 1.
- The p-value is not the probability that the null hypothesis is true, or the probability that the alternative hypothesis is false; it is the probability of obtaining results at least as extreme as the results actually observed under the assumption that the null hypothesis was correct, which can indicate the incompatibility of results with the specific statistical model assumed in the null hypothesis. This misconception, and similar ones like it, contributes to the common misuse of p-values in education and research.
- If one were to flip a fair coin five times and get heads each time, it would not be any more likely for a sixth flip to come up tails. Phrased another way, after a long and/or unlikely streak of independently random events, the probability of the next event is not influenced by the preceding events. Humans often feel that the underrepresented outcome is more likely, as if it is due to happen. Such thinking may be attributed to the mistaken belief that gambling, or even chance itself, is a fair process that can correct itself in the event of streaks.
- The probability of some event, A, given another event B is not the same as the probability of B given A. This is commonly known as the prosecutors fallacy, which ignores preexisting probabilities when judging how likely something is. For instance, the odds that someone is guilty, given the evidence is not the same as the odds of the evidence being there given the persons innocence. The former is what we're most often looking for, while the second is extremely low, not always because the person is guilty, but because the evidence is quite rare to begin with.

== Physics ==
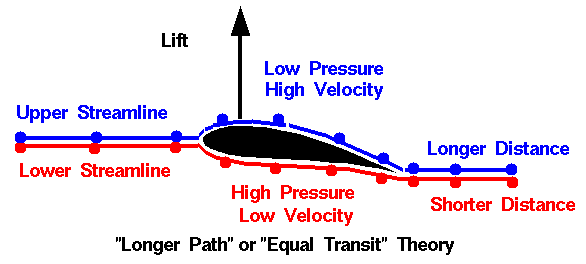
An illustration of the incorrect equal transit-time explanation of airfoil lift

- The lift force is not generated by the air taking the same time to travel above and below an aircraft's wing. This misconception, sometimes called the equal transit-time fallacy, is widespread among textbooks and non-technical reference books, and even appears in pilot training materials. In fact, the air moving over the top of an aerofoil generating lift is always moving much faster than the equal transit theory would imply, as described in the incorrect and correct explanations of lift force.

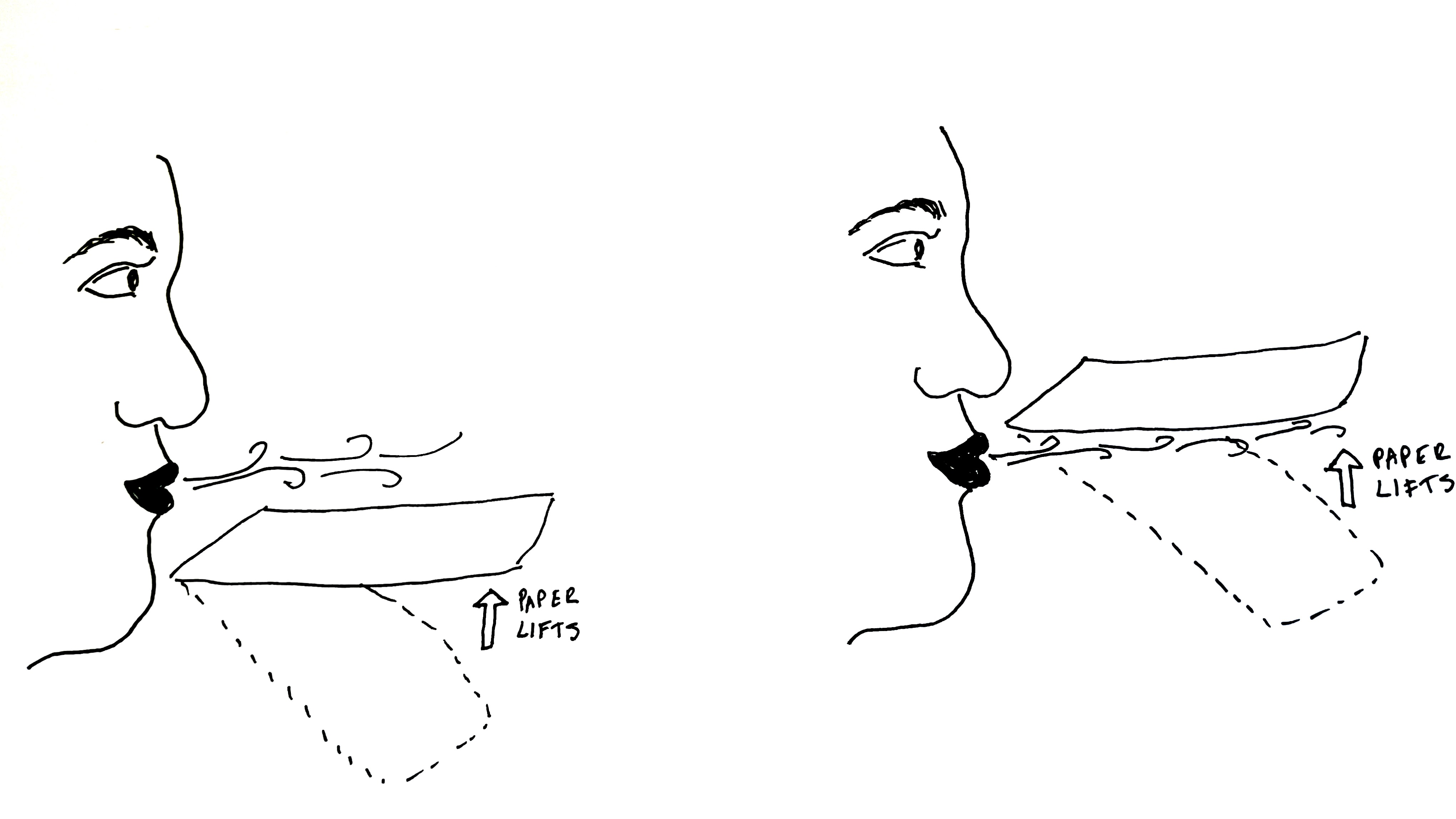
Blowing over a piece of paper causes it to rise. Blowing under a piece of paper also causes it to rise. Neither is a demonstration of Bernoulli's Principle.

- Blowing over a curved piece of paper does not demonstrate Bernoulli's principle. Although a common classroom experiment is often explained this way, Bernoulli's principle applies only within a flow field, and the air above and below the paper are in different flow fields. The paper rises because the air follows the curve of the paper and a curved streamline will develop pressure differences perpendicular to the airflow.
- The Coriolis effect does not cause water to consistently drain from basins in a clockwise/counter-clockwise direction depending on the hemisphere. The common myth often refers to the draining action of flush toilets and bathtubs. In fact, rotation is determined by whatever minor rotation is initially present at the time the water starts to drain, as the magnitude of the Coriolis acceleration is negligibly small compared to the inertial acceleration of flow within a typical basin.
- General relativity does not imply that mass increases as an object approaches the speed of light; it is an object's momentum, a quantity dependent upon both mass and velocity, that increases asymptotically as it approaches the speed of light. The mass-energy equivalence equation is thus more accurately expressed as E=γmc², where γ is a variable dependent upon velocity. For an object at rest, γ=1 resulting in the familiar equation E=mc².
- Neither gyroscopic forces nor geometric trail are required for a rider to balance a bicycle or for it to demonstrate self-stability. Although gyroscopic forces and trail can be contributing factors, it has been demonstrated that those factors are neither required nor sufficient by themselves.
- A penny dropped from the Empire State Building would not kill a person or crack the sidewalk. A penny is too light and has too much air resistance to acquire enough speed to do much damage since it reaches terminal velocity after falling about 15 metres (50 ft). Heavier or more aerodynamic objects could cause significant damage if dropped from that height.
- Using a programmable thermostat's setback feature to limit heating or cooling in a temporarily unoccupied building does not waste as much energy as leaving the temperature constant. Using setback saves energy (5–15%) because heat transfer across the surface of the building is roughly proportional to the temperature difference between its inside and the outside.
- It is not possible for a person to completely submerge in quicksand, as commonly depicted in fiction, although sand entrapment in the nearshore of a body of water can be a drowning hazard as the tide rises.
- Quantum nonlocality caused by quantum entanglement does not allow faster-than-light communication or imply instant action at a distance, despite its common characterization as "spooky action at a distance". Rather, it means that certain experiments cannot be explained by local realism.
- The slipperiness of ice is not due to pressure melting. While it is true that increased pressure, such as that exerted by someone standing on a sheet of ice, will lower the melting point of ice, experiments show that the effect is too weak to account for the lowered friction. Materials scientists still debate whether premelting or the heat of friction is the dominant cause of ice's slipperiness.

== Psychology and neuroscience ==
- Cannabis use in pregnancy is not low risk. The tetrahydrocannabinol (THC) within cannabis crosses the placenta, directly exposing the developing fetus to this chemical. Cannabis use in pregnancy is linked to increased risk of preterm delivery and lower birth weight, along with a higher likelihood of infants needing placement in the neonatal intensive care unit. Additionally, infants exposed to cannabis in pregnancy may have increased rates of behavioral conditions such as hyperactivity and impulsivity, attention deficits, sleep disorders, emotional disturbances, and a higher chance of substance use. According to a 2015 study, 70% of pregnant American women that had used marijuana in the past year thought that consumption of cannabis once or twice per week carried low to no risk of general harm.
- True photographic memory (the ability to remember endless images, particularly pages or numbers, with such a high degree of precision that the image mimics a photo) has never been demonstrated to exist in any individual, although a small number of young children have eidetic memory, where they can recall an object with high precision for a few minutes after it is no longer present. Many people have claimed to have a photographic memory, but those people have been shown to have high precision memories as a result of mnemonic devices rather than a natural capacity for detailed memory encoding. There are rare cases of individuals with exceptional memory, but none of them have a memory that mimics that of a camera.
- The phase of the Moon does not influence fertility, cause a fluctuation in crime, or affect the stock market. There is no correlation between the lunar cycle and human biology or behavior. However, the increased amount of illumination during the full moon may account for increased epileptic episodes, motorcycle accidents, or sleep disorders.
- Repressed memories (the latent, oftentimes traumatic memories of early childhood that are recalled later in life) do not exist. This idea may have been popularized by Marcel Proust's In Search of Lost Time. However, a person cannot retain memories from infancy. The localized amnesia of childhood trauma is impossible, although false memories can be induced.

=== Mental disorders ===
- Vaccines do not cause autism. There have been no successful attempts to reproduce fraudulent research by British ex-doctor Andrew Wakefield, where the misconception likely originates. Wakefield's research was ultimately shown to have been manipulated.
- Dyslexia is not defined or diagnosed as mirror writing or reading letters or words backwards. Mirror writing and reading letters or words backwards are behaviors seen in many children (dyslexic or not) as they learn to read and write. Dyslexia is a neurodevelopmental disorder of people who have at least average intelligence and who have difficulty in reading and writing that is not otherwise explained by low intelligence.
- Self-harm is not generally an attention-seeking behavior. People who engage in self-harm are typically very self-conscious of their wounds and scars and feel guilty about their behavior, leading them to go to great lengths to conceal it from others. They may offer alternative explanations for their injuries, or conceal their scars with clothing.
- There is no evidence that a chemical imbalance or neurotransmitter deficiency is the sole factor in depression and other mental disorders, but rather a combination of biological, psychological, and social factors.
- Schizophrenia does not involve split or multiple personalities. It is characterized by continuous or relapsing episodes of psychosis. Major symptoms include hallucinations (typically hearing voices), delusions, paranoia, and disorganized thinking. Other symptoms include social withdrawal, decreased emotional expression, and apathy. The term was coined from the Greek roots schizein and phrēn, "to split" and "mind", in reference to a "splitting of mental functions" seen in schizophrenia, not a splitting of the personality. A split or multiple personality is dissociative identity disorder.

=== Brain ===
- Broad generalizations are often made in popular psychology about certain brain functions being lateralized, or more predominant in one hemisphere than the other. These claims are often inaccurate or overstated.
- The human brain, particularly the prefrontal cortex, does not reach "full maturity" or "full development" at any particular age (e.g. 16, 18, 21, 25, 30). Changes in structure and myelination of gray matter are recorded to continue with relative consistency all throughout life including until death. Different mental abilities peak earlier or later in life.
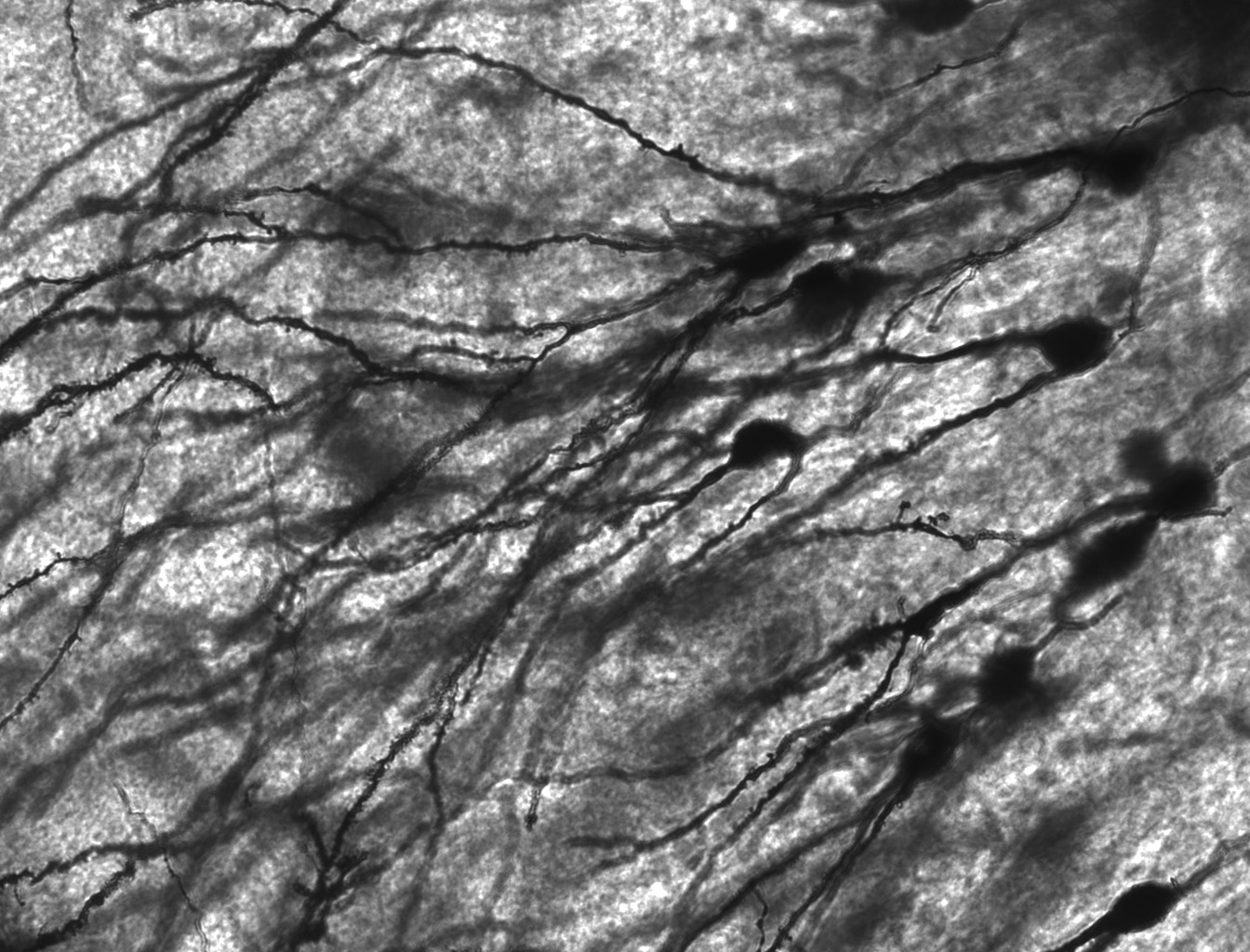
- Some neurons can reform in the human brain.
  Humans do not generate all of the brain cells they will ever have by the age of two years. Although this belief was held by medical experts until 1998, it is now understood that new neurons can be created after infancy in some parts of the brain into late adulthood.
- People do not use only 10% of their brains. While it is true that a small minority of neurons in the brain are actively firing at any one time, a healthy human will normally use most of their brain over the course of a day, and the inactive neurons are important as well. The idea that activating 100% of the brain would allow someone to achieve their maximum potential and/or gain various psychic abilities is common in folklore and fiction, but doing so in real life would likely result in a fatal seizure. This misconception was attributed to late 19th century leading thinker William James, who apparently used the expression only metaphorically.
- Although Phineas Gage's brain injuries, caused by a several-foot-long tamping rod driven completely through his skull, caused him to become temporarily disabled, descriptions of his aberrant behavior in later life are disputed, contradicting other claims that he recovered fully.

=== Senses ===
An incorrect map of the tongue showing taste zones. In fact, all zones can sense all tastes.

- Humans have more than the commonly cited five senses. The number of senses in various categorizations ranges from 5 to more than 20. In addition to sight, smell, taste, touch, and hearing, which were the senses identified by Aristotle, humans can sense balance and acceleration (equilibrioception), pain (nociception), body and limb position (proprioception or kinesthetic sense), and relative temperature (thermoception). Other senses sometimes identified are the sense of time, echolocation, itching, pressure, hunger, thirst, fullness of the stomach, need to urinate, need to defecate, blood carbon dioxide (CO_{2}) levels, and electric field sensation.
- All different tastes can be detected on all parts of the tongue by taste buds, with slightly increased sensitivities in different locations depending on the person; the tongue map showing the contrary is fallacious.
- There are not four primary tastes, but five: in addition to bitter, sour, salty, and sweet, humans have taste receptors for umami, which is a "savory" or "meaty" taste. Fat does interact with specific receptors in taste bud cells, but whether it is a sixth primary taste remains inconclusive.
- The human sense of smell is not weak or underdeveloped. Humans have similar senses of smell to other mammals, and are more sensitive to some odors than rodents and dogs.

== Toxicology ==
- Smokeless tobacco is not a "safe" alternative to conventional tobacco; smokeless tobacco products contain nicotine and are therefore highly addictive. They also can cause various harmful effects such as dental disease, oral cancer, oesophagus cancer, and pancreas cancer, coronary heart disease, as well as negative reproductive effects including stillbirth, premature birth and low birth weight.
- Swallowing gasoline does not generally require special emergency treatment, as long as it goes into the stomach and not the lungs. This does not mean gasoline is safe to drink; it is very dangerous when consumed. Inducing vomiting can make it worse.
- A chloroform-soaked rag cannot instantly incapacitate a person. It takes at least five minutes of inhaling an item soaked in chloroform to render a person unconscious. Most criminal cases involving chloroform also involve another drug being co-administered, such as alcohol or diazepam, or the victim being found to have been complicit in its administration. The misconception that chloroform can be used as an incapacitating agent has been popularized by crime fiction authors.
- Although bananas contain naturally occurring radioactive isotopes, particularly potassium-40 (^{40}K), which emit ionizing radiation when undergoing radioactive decay, the levels of such radiation are far too low to induce radiation poisoning, and bananas are not a radiation hazard. It would not be physically possible to eat enough bananas to cause radiation poisoning, as the radiation dose from bananas is non-cumulative. (See also: Banana equivalent dose)
- Ingesting Visine, a brand of eye drops, does not cause diarrhea. It is neurotoxic, with consumption causing several serious side effects. Pranks spiking people with Visine rose after the misconception was popularized by the film Wedding Crashers.

== Transportation ==
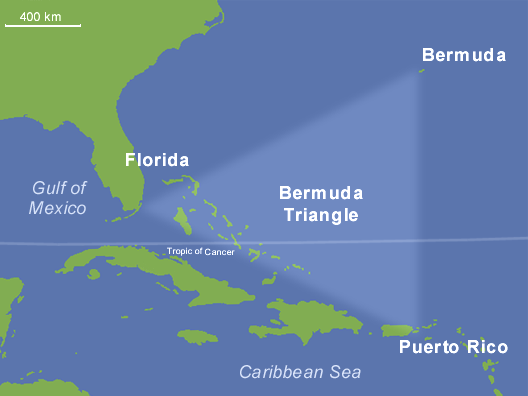
One version of the Bermuda Triangle area

- The Bermuda Triangle does not have any more shipwrecks or mysterious disappearances than most other waterways.
- Toilet waste is never intentionally jettisoned from commercial aircraft. All waste is collected in tanks and emptied into lavatory service vehicles. Blue ice is caused by accidental leakage from the waste tank.
- Automotive batteries stored on a concrete floor do not discharge faster than they would on other surfaces. Most modern automotive batteries are sealed and do not leak battery acid when properly stored, although the sulfuric acid in them can leak out and stain, etch, or corrode concrete floors if their cases crack or tip over or their vent-holes are breached by floods.
- Building new roads, or widening existing ones, does not always reduce congestion. Sometimes it can make the congestion worse.
- A penny on a railroad track will not derail a train. While objects on the track as small as bricks are a major cause of derailments, a penny is too small and will likely just be flattened. However, there is an injury risk from flattened pennies and other debris being ejected at high speeds by the weight of a train, and there are several cases where people have been hit by trains while attempting this stunt. In the early 20th century, leaving a penny on a railroad track was a common method for pressed pennies.

== Weapons ==
- Someone hit by a shotgun will not fly backwards like it is often portrayed in movies, and the same is true for other handheld weapons. The momentum of the bullet is no higher than the recoil transmitted to the shooter, which is too little to cause any significant motion.
- Land mines explode immediately when stepped on. They are not armed when stepped on and then triggered by stepping off, as depicted in fictional portrayals where disarming the mine is a source of narrative.

== Sources ==
- Kahn, Charles H. (2001). Pythagoras and the Pythagoreans: A Brief History. Indianapolis, Indiana and Cambridge, England: Hackett Publishing Company. ISBN 978-0-87220-575-8. OCLC 46394974 – via Internet Archive.
- Varasdi, J. Allen (1996). Myth Information. New York: Ballantine Books. ISBN 0-345-41049-1.
