= Vaccines and SIDS =

Conspiracy theory

- Claims: Vaccines are claimed to cause sudden infant death syndrome
- Year proposed: 1991
- Original proponents: Attributed to Robert Mendelsohn
- Subsequent proponents: Viera Scheibner, Kelly Brogan

A speculated link between vaccines and SIDS (Sudden Infant Death Syndrome) has been refuted, but remains a common anti-vaccine claim. The claim, attributed to Robert Mendelsohn in 1991 and promoted by anti-vaccination activists such as Viera Scheibner in the early 1990s, is that vaccines, especially the DTP vaccine that protects against diphtheria, tetanus and pertussis, sometimes causes sudden infant death syndrome. The World Health Organization has classified this as a "common misconception".

Some also claim that a vaccine court case, Boatmon v. Secretary of Health and Human Services, 13-611 (Fed. Cl. 2017), proves this link. While compensation was awarded to Boatmon, this did not prove any link, and the award was in any case vacated in July 2018 as the Special master had applied too low a standard of proof.

Multiple studies and meta-analyses have shown that vaccinated children are less likely to die of SIDS.

In 2026, Elsevier retracted a 2021 study by longtime vaccine critic Neil Z. Miller published in Toxicology Reports claiming SIDS is linked to vaccines.
