= Phone repair with rice =

Supposed method for preventing water damage

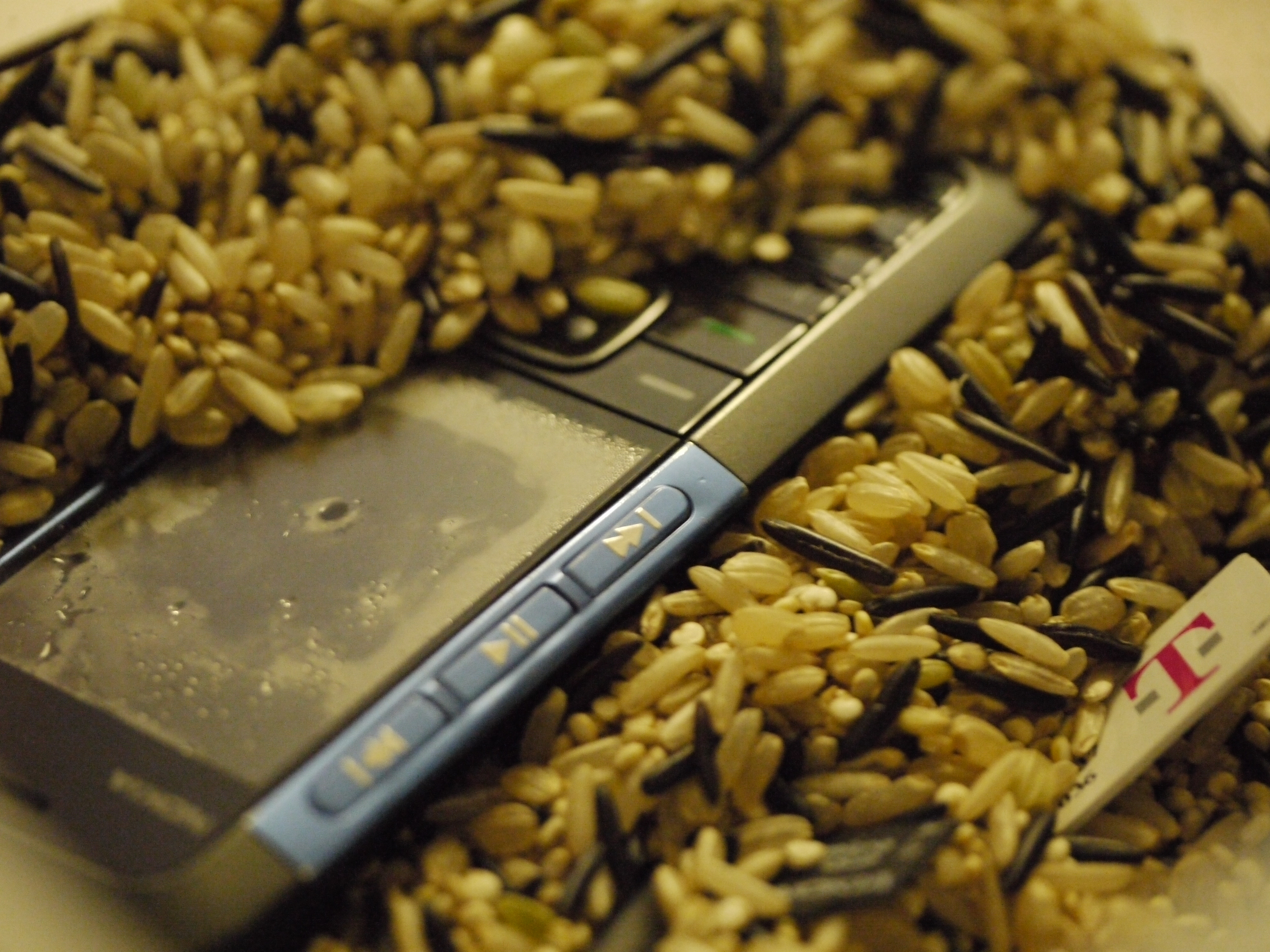
A water-damaged Nokia 5310 phone submerged in dry rice

Submerging a mobile device into rice is common mitigation advice to avoid water damage to electronics which have been splashed with or immersed in liquid. This technique has not been shown to be effective in avoiding damage. Submerging these devices into a desiccant may or may not be more effective than leaving them to dry in open air. Uncooked rice is inferior to other common desiccants such as silica gel or cat litter, and Apple Support warns that small particles of rice could damage a phone.

== History ==
Rice has traditionally been used to keep camera equipment and films dry in tropical environments, with Yankee magazine recommending in 1996 the use of uncooked rice as an "in a pinch" substitution for silica gel desiccant.

In July 2007, less than a month after the original iPhone was released, a member of MacRumors named Jorsuss started a thread titled "I dropped my iPhone in water" in which they said they had used "the rice trick" to recover it. This may have been the first documented attempt to use the procedure on an iPhone.

== See also ==
- IP Code
- List of common misconceptions about science, technology, and mathematics § Computing and the Internet
