= Checkout charity =

Fundraising method

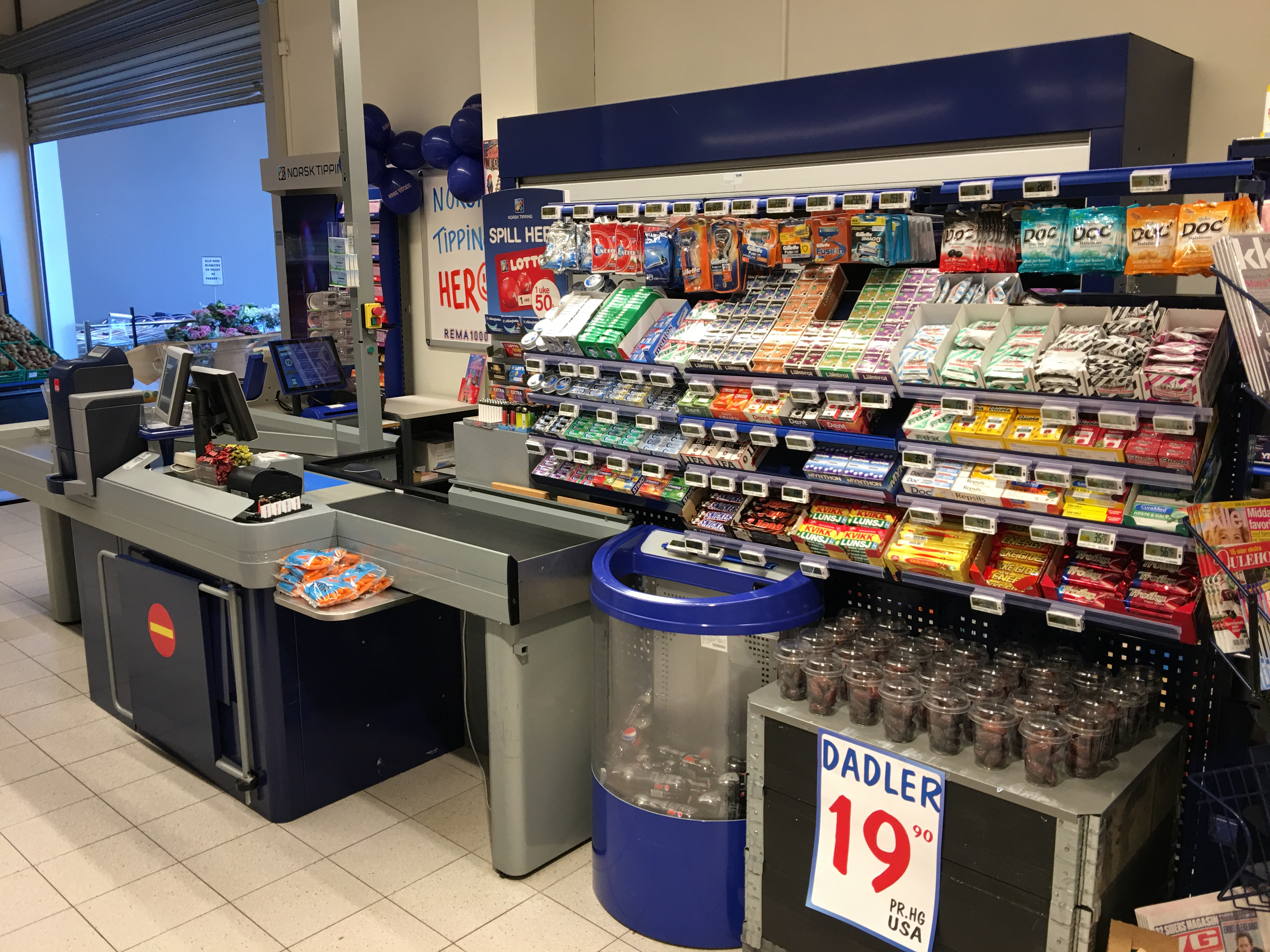
A grocery store checkout, where this type of fundraising most often takes place

Checkout charity, also known as point-of-sale fundraising, refers to the phenomenon of customers at a business being asked to donate money to charitable causes. The practice is most frequent at grocery stores. Checkout charity may also exist at other kinds of businesses, such as liquor stores. Customers may be asked to round their purchase to the nearest dollar or make an otherwise nominal donation.

== Reception ==
Checkout charity can be effective at raising money for charities through the cumulative results of many small donations over time. General attitudes towards checkout charity by customers can vary, from positive to negative. Positive reactions from customers can include an association of the halo effect. Negative reactions can result from customers feeling pressured or anxious when prompted to donate to a charitable cause in this context. They may also be concerned about how such funds are used. Customers may also feel annoyed, particularly if they do not deem the cause to be a worthy one, as they are likely to receive prompts to donate at several retailers in their day-to-day lives. A 2013 Ipsos poll determined that the majority of Canadians had a negative reaction towards checkout charity.

A common misconception, often spread via online platforms, is that stores offering checkout charity do so to save money on taxes. This is not true, and is not possible; corporation taxes are assessed on profit, and a customer's donation would not change the amount of profit and therefore tax payable by the store. A business would need to donate its own money to be able to claim a tax deduction, which would in any event be many times less than the cost of the donation in profit; it is impossible to make money by donating to charity. Businesses engage in this activity to support their corporate social responsibility goals and/or improve their public image.

Charities may seek donations through this method because it is more cost effective and is not as time intensive as other fundraising initiatives such as canvassing door-to-door or holding charity-specific events. In the United States, more than 4.9 billion dollars have been raised by checkout charity donations.

== See also ==
- Street fundraising
