= Viera Scheibner =

Slovak-Australian anti-vaccination activist

- Born: 27 March 1935 (age 91); Bratislava, Czechoslovakia
- Spouses: Ervin Scheibner; Leif Karlsson

Viera Scheibner (Slovak: Viera Scheibnerová; born 27 March 1935, Bratislava) is a Slovak-Australian anti-vaccination activist and retired geologist. From 1958 until 1968 she was assistant professor in the department of geology at Comenius University, Bratislava. Since her retirement from the Department of Mineral Resources, New South Wales, Australia in 1987, Scheibner has been active in the anti-vaccination field, writing and giving lectures opposing vaccines and vaccinations.

A number of critics have questioned her qualifications, research abilities, and honesty.

== Education and career ==
Viera Scheibner was born in Bratislava (formerly Czechoslovakia, now Slovak Republic).

In 1953, Scheibner studied medicine for one year at Masaryk University in Brno (Faculty of Medicine). She did not complete her studies, and obtained no medical qualifications. She then enrolled in the Faculty of Sciences (Geology), and in 1954 transferred to the Comenius University in Bratislava where she graduated in 1958 under prof. D. Andrusov. During 1958–1961, she became a lecturer in the Department of Geology and Palaeontology of the Comenius University, Bratislava and was also a Senior Lecturer 1962–1967, at the Department of Geology and Palaeontology at Comenius University. Scheibner was awarded a doctorate in Natural Sciences (RNDr.) from the Comenius University in Bratislava in 1964. In 1967–1968 she served as Senior Associate Professor (Docent) at the Department of Geology and Palaeontology of Jan Amos Comenius University, Bratislava.

In 1968, Scheibner together with her husband Ervin Scheibner emigrated to Australia and assumed a position as a micro-palaeontologist with the Geological Survey of New South Wales, Department of Mines, later becoming the Department of Mineral Resources.

The primary emphasis of Scheibner's work in Australia with the NSW Department of Mines was the study of the Cretaceous and Permian Foraminifera of the Great Australian Basin in New South Wales. She also studied the South Australian and Carnarvon Basins in Western Australia, South Africa and the Indian Peninsula, and the Permian Foraminifera of the Sydney Basin. From 1972 to 1976 Scheibner was invited to participate in the Deep Sea Drilling Project (DSDP) conducted under the auspices of the Scripps Institution of Oceanography, in the Atlantic and Indian Oceans. The results of these studies were published in the Initial Reports of the Deep Sea Drilling Project (DSDP).

== Views on vaccines ==
Scheibner authored the 1993 book Vaccination: 100 Years of Orthodox Research Shows That Vaccines Represent an Assault on the Immune System, described "highly inaccurate" in a 2000 article in the journal Pediatrics. Her work has been commonly referenced by antivaccination chiropractors.

=== Sudden infant death syndrome ===
Scheibner began claiming that there is a link between vaccination and SIDS in the early 1990s, and in a book Vaccination... published in 1993. In the book and subsequently, she has speculated that "vaccination is the single biggest cause of SIDS". However data shows that since she began making her claims, vaccination rates for Birth to 2-years component of the Immunisation Schedule in Australia increased from 53% in 1990 to 92% in 2006, while SIDS deaths fell by 81% over the same period. A 2007 meta-analysis found that vaccines halve the risk of SIDS.

Scheibner claimed that when Japan paused their Pertussis vaccination program in 1974, SIDS deaths disappeared in the country. However, Victorian medical practitioner Stephen Basser, writing in the Australian Skeptic magazine, said that the studies Scheibner cited did not support her statements and that she had omitted information [from the studies] which did not support her position, including data showing pertussis mortality in Japan increased 800% in the five years following the pause in Pertussis vaccination.

=== Shaken baby syndrome ===
Scheibner claims that injuries and death attributed to shaken baby syndrome, including retinal bleeding, broken bones, fractured skulls and detached retinas are actually caused by vaccination although no science supports this claim.

Commissioner William Carter, Q.C., who was hearing a Human Rights and Equal Opportunity Commission enquiry in which Viera Scheibner was called as a witness, dismissed her claims on the subject of vaccines, finding that he was unsatisfied with her formal qualifications and professional experience, which he found did not "properly equip her to provide a valid professional opinion on the complex subject of immunology". As a result, he was unwilling to accept her evidence in the enquiry.

In 2001, Brian Pezzutti criticised Scheibner's anti-vaccination campaigning in the NSW Legislative Council, describing Scheibner as providing "misleading information", and highlighting her March letter to the Medical Observer which "makes claims that are not supported by the documentation she referred to". Pezzutti stated that it was "very important for people to realise that the information provided by Dr Scheibner is not accurate".

In 1997, the Australian Skeptics awarded her the "Bent Spoon Award". This award is presented annually to the Australian "perpetrator of the most preposterous piece of pseudoscientific piffle":

"The unanimous choice of the judges was Dr Viera Scheibner for her high profile anti-immunisation campaign which, by promoting new age and conspiracy mythology and by owing little to scientific methodologies or research, poses a serious threat to the health of Australian children."

== Publications ==
- 1993 Vaccination: 100 years of orthodox research shows that vaccines represent an assault on the immune system, ISBN 0-646-15124-X
- 2000 Behavioural Problems in Childhood, ISBN 0-9578007-0-3

== See also ==
- List of vaccine topics
