= Robert S. Mendelsohn =

American pediatrician (1926–1988)

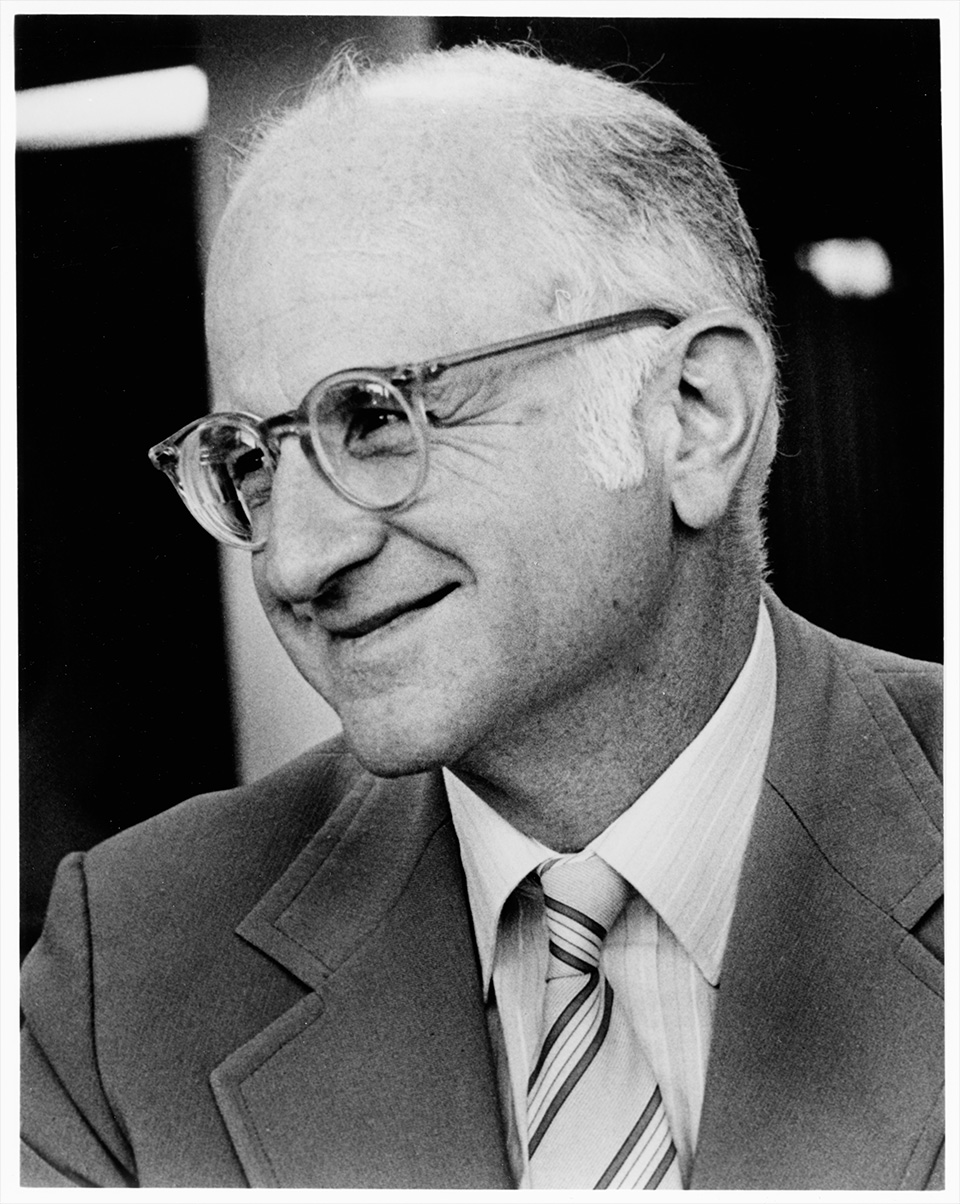
- Original photo by Bob Miller, Seattle Post Intelligencer Oct. 28, 1980
- Born: July 13, 1926; Chicago, Illinois, U.S.
- Died: April 5, 1988 (aged 61); Evanston, Illinois, U.S.
- Education: University of Chicago

Robert S. Mendelsohn (July 13, 1926 – April 5, 1988) was an American pediatrician, anti-vaccinationist and critic of medical paternalism. He denounced unnecessary hysterectomies, radical mastectomies, and dangerous medications, reminding his readers of public health failures such as the 1976 swine flu outbreak and the damage caused to daughters of women who took the drug diethylstilbestrol during pregnancy. He portrayed doctors as powerful priests of a primitive religion, with dishonesty as its central ethic. His mild manner appealed to the public, while his message infuriated his medical colleagues.

Mendelsohn wrote a syndicated newspaper column called The People's Doctor, and also produced a newsletter with the same name (the newsletter continued after his death until 1992, under the name The Doctor's People.) He published five books, including Confessions of a Medical Heretic, Mal(e) Practice: How Doctors Manipulate Women, and How to Raise a Healthy Child…In Spite of Your Doctor. He appeared on over 500 television and radio talk shows.

== Education and career ==
Mendelsohn was born in Chicago, Illinois. He received his medical degree from the University of Chicago in 1951. He was certified by the American Board of Pediatrics. Mendelsohn had a full-time private pediatric practice from 1956 to 1967, and continued to see patients of all ages on a consultancy basis until his death in 1988.

For 12 years, Mendelsohn was an instructor at Northwestern University Medical College, and was associate professor of pediatrics and community health and preventive medicine at the University of Illinois College of Medicine for another 12 years.

Mendelsohn served as National Director of Project Head Start's Medical Consultation Service, a position he was later forced to resign after criticizing the “deadening atmosphere” of regular public schools. He served as Chairman of the Medical Licensing Committee of Illinois. He was president of the alternative medicine National Health Federation (NHF) between 1981 and 1982.

== Views and reception ==
Dr. Mendelsohn with colleague and patient

Mendelsohn said that the greatest danger to American women's health was often their own doctors, and contended that chauvinistic physicians subjected female patients to degrading, unnecessary and often dangerous medical procedures. Cancer treatments like hysterectomy and radical mastectomy, according to Mendelsohn, were among the most indiscriminately recommended surgical procedures.

In an era in which the side effects of medications and the risks of medical treatments were hardly known except to doctors, Mendelsohn insisted that patients, too, had the right to such information. In the first of his books to attract widespread publicity, Confessions of a Medical Heretic (Contemporary Books 1979), he describes his efforts to make the Physician's Desk Reference, the authoritative guide to medications and medical treatments, available to the public.

In Confessions, Mendelsohn argued that the methods of modern medicine were often more dangerous than the diseases they were designed to diagnose and treat. He advised consumers to be suspicious of their doctors. “One of the unwritten rules in Modern Medicine is always to write a prescription for a new drug quickly, before all its side effects have come to the surface.” (Confessions of a Medical Heretic, p. 32)

Mendelsohn opposed vaccinations for children, claiming the shots are dangerous and worthless. He was an anti-vaccination activist, an opinion widely rejected by the medical community.

His book Confessions of a Medical Heretic was negatively reviewed in the Journal of the American Medical Association, the reviewer noted that "the technique of describing one specific situation or case history and then generalizing to all situations or all case histories is a dangerous one, and such extrapolations are carefully avoided by all responsible scientists. However, this approach of Mendelsohn's supplies the grist for his mill— and its faulty."

Quackwatch has noted that Mendelsohn "engaged in irresponsible criticism of the medical profession and science-based health care during most of his medical career."

Nutritionist Kurt Butler described Mendelsohn as a "Whiney-voiced crackpot who made himself rich and famous by leading the bash-doctors movements now in vogue. Mendelsohn, now deceased, made a career of telling Americans that their doctors are out to rob and kill them. He urged everyone to avoid doctors and go instead to chiropractors, naturopaths and health fraud store clerks for their health care."

== Death ==
He died April 5, 1988, at his home in Evanston, Illinois.

== Publications ==
- 1982, Male Practice: How Doctors Manipulate Women, ISBN 0-8092-5721-1
- 1987, How To Raise a Healthy Child In Spite of Your Doctor, NTC/Contemporary Publishing Company, ISBN 0-8092-4995-2
- 1991, Confessions of a Medical Heretic, ISBN 0-8092-7726-3 (This book was first published in 1979)
- 1985, Dissent in Medicine…Nine Doctors Speak Out, Contemporary Books, Inc.
- 1988, But Doctor, About That Shot: The Risks of Immunizations and How to Avoid Them, by Robert S. Mendelsohn, M.D., edited by Vera Chatz and published by The People's Doctor, Inc.
- The People’s Doctor Newsletter – published monthly from 1980 to 1988.
