= Fan death =

Supposed death from an electric fan

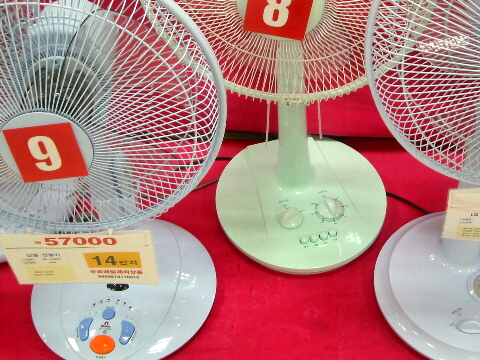
- Electric fans sold in South Korea

Korean name
- Hangul: 선풍기 사망설
- Hanja: 扇風機 死亡說
- RR: seonpunggi samangseol
- MR: sŏnp'unggi samangsŏl

Fan death is the misconception that people have died as a result of running an electric fan in a closed room with no open windows. While the supposed mechanics of fan death are impossible given how electric fans operate, wide-scale belief in fan death persisted until the mid-2010s in South Korea and, to a lesser extent, Japan. The myth still persists to this day among some South Koreans.

== Origins of the belief ==
It is unclear how the myth originated, but fears about electric fans date back to their introduction to Korea, with stories warning of the risks of nausea, asphyxiation, and facial paralysis from the new technology since the 1920s and 1930s.

One conspiracy theory is that the South Korean government created or perpetuated the myth as propaganda to curb the energy consumption of South Korean households during the 1970s energy crisis. However, Slate disputes this theory by noting that the myth likely predates the energy crisis by several decades, citing a 1927 article about "Strange Harm from Electric Fans".

== Proposed explanation ==
It is alleged that fans may cause asphyxiation by oxygen displacement and carbon dioxide intoxication. In the process of human respiration, inhaled fresh air is exhaled with a lower concentration of oxygen gas (O_{2}) and higher concentration of carbon dioxide gas (CO_{2}), causing a gradual reduction of O_{2} and buildup of CO_{2} in a completely unventilated room.

However, that gradual reduction of O_{2} and buildup of CO_{2} occurs due to respiration in any room without ventilation, and a running fan will not meaningfully worsen or improve the problem, except in zero-G environments where exhaled air tends to form a bubble around astronauts' heads instead of dispersing normally.

== Media coverage ==
During the summer, mainstream South Korean news sources regularly report alleged cases of fan death. A typical example is this excerpt from the July 4, 2011, edition of The Korea Herald, an English-language newspaper:

A man reportedly died on Monday morning after sleeping with an electric fan running. The 59-year-old victim, only known by his surname Min, was found dead with the fan fixed directly at him.

However, the article noted that there was "no evidence" the fan caused the death. University of Miami researcher Larry Kalkstein says a misunderstanding in translation resulted in his accidental endorsement of the fan death theory, which he denies is a real phenomenon.

Ken Jennings, writing for Slate in 2013, said that, based on "a recent email survey of contacts in Korea", opinion seemed to be shifting among younger Koreans: "A decade of Internet skepticism seems to have accomplished what the preceding 75 years could not: convinced a nation that Korean fan death is probably hot air."

Philip Hiscock, when interviewed by The Star, suggested that fan death's prevalence in Korean beliefs and its potential as a euphemism contributed to the idea's continuation: "Traditional fairy legends (or) contemporary UFO abductions are used for things that are either inadmissible or untellable in present company. The fact that fan death is well known in Korea (and) can be used to postpone explanations or cover up the truth is very interesting and a very traditional way of going about things."

=== South Korean government ===
The Korea Consumer Protection Board (KCPB), a South Korean government-funded public agency, issued a consumer safety alert in 2006 warning that "asphyxiation from electric fans and air conditioners" was among South Korea's five most common summer accidents or injuries, according to data they collected. The KCPB published the following:

If bodies are exposed to electric fans or air conditioners for too long, it causes [the] bodies to lose water and [causes] hypothermia. If directly in contact with [air current from] a fan, this could lead to death from [an] increase of carbon dioxide saturation concentration and decrease of oxygen concentration. The risks are higher for the elderly and patients with respiratory problems. From 2003 [to] 2005, a total of 20 cases were reported through the CISS [Consumer Injury Surveillance System] involving asphyxiations caused by leaving electric fans and air conditioners on while sleeping. To prevent asphyxiation, timers should be set, wind direction should be rotated, and doors should be left open.

== Similar superstitions ==
Fan death is an extreme version of a widespread superstition among various cultures that moving air causes illness. Italians wear scarves to protect against a supposed colpo d'aria (hit of air). Such a colpo is alleged to cause neck pain, tonsillitis, headaches, cramps, or respiratory illness, and has fueled a fear of air conditioning. The German superstition of Zugluft operates similarly, and has suppressed the use of fans or air conditioners during heat waves.

== See also ==
- Culture of South Korea
- Culture-bound syndrome
- List of common misconceptions
