= Tongue map =

Misconception about taste and the tongue

The myth of the tongue map: that 1 tastes bitter, 2 tastes sour, 3 tastes salty, and 4 tastes sweet.

The tongue map or taste map is a common misconception that different sections of the tongue are exclusively responsible for different basic tastes. It is illustrated with a schematic map of the tongue, with certain parts of the tongue labeled for each taste. The concept is taught in some schools, but is incorrect; every taste sensation can come from all regions of the tongue, though certain parts are more sensitive to certain tastes.

== History ==
The theory behind this map originated from a book written by Harvard psychologist Edwin Boring in 1942, which included a translation of a German paper, Zur Psychophysik des Geschmackssinnes (The Psychophysics of Taste), by David P. Hänig, written in 1901. Boring replotted and normalized the graphs from the original paper, which were meant to show the taste thresholds of different parts of the tongue. The renormalized versions were interpreted incorrectly by other authors to indicate that there was no sensation where the curves showed a minimum, and maximum sensation where the curves showed a maximum, when the reality was a very small difference between the two. This misinterpretation suggested that each part of the tongue tastes exactly one basic taste.

The paper showed minute differences in threshold detection levels across the tongue, but these differences were later taken out of context and the minute difference in threshold sensitivity was misconstrued in textbooks as a difference in sensation. Into the late 1990s, tongue map experiments were a teaching tool in high school biology classes. Students were given strips of paper with different tastes on them and told where each taste should be more noticeable. They then were instructed to touch those taste strips on different areas of their lab partner's tongue and record the (proper) sensation result.

While some parts of the tongue may be able to detect a taste before the others do, all parts are equally capable of conveying the qualia of all tastes. Threshold sensitivity may differ across the tongue, but intensity of sensation does not.

The same paper included a taste bud distribution diagram that showed a "taste belt".

In 1974, Virginia Collings investigated the topic again, and confirmed that all the tastes exist on all parts of the tongue.

== Taste belt ==
The misinterpreted diagram that sparked this myth shows human taste buds distributed in a "taste belt" along the inside of the tongue.

Prior to this, A. Hoffmann had concluded in 1875 that the dorsal center of the human tongue has practically no fungiform papillae and taste buds, and it was this finding that the diagram describes.
