= List of MeSH codes (A08) =

The following is a partial list of the "A" codes for Medical Subject Headings (MeSH), as defined by the United States National Library of Medicine (NLM).

This list continues the information at List of MeSH codes (A07). Codes following these are found at List of MeSH codes (A09). For other MeSH codes, see List of MeSH codes.

The source for this content is the set of MeSH Trees from the NLM.

== MeSH A08 – nervous system ==
=== MeSH A08.186 – central nervous system ===
==== MeSH A08.186.211 – brain ====
- MeSH A08.186.211.035 – blood–brain barrier
- MeSH A08.186.211.132 – brain stem
- MeSH A08.186.211.132.659 – mesencephalon
- MeSH A08.186.211.132.659.237 – corpora quadrigemina
- MeSH A08.186.211.132.659.237.364 – inferior colliculus
- MeSH A08.186.211.132.659.237.816 – superior colliculus
- MeSH A08.186.211.132.659.473 – locus coeruleus
- MeSH A08.186.211.132.659.632 – raphe nuclei
- MeSH A08.186.211.132.659.687 – substantia nigra
- MeSH A08.186.211.132.659.822 – tegmentum mesencephali
- MeSH A08.186.211.132.659.822.187 – cerebral aqueduct
- MeSH A08.186.211.132.659.822.575 – pedunculopontine tegmental nucleus
- MeSH A08.186.211.132.659.822.595 – periaqueductal gray
- MeSH A08.186.211.132.659.822.642 – red nucleus
- MeSH A08.186.211.132.659.822.820 – ventral tegmental area
- MeSH A08.186.211.132.772 – reticular formation
- MeSH A08.186.211.132.772.646 – respiratory center
- MeSH A08.186.211.132.810 – rhombencephalon
- MeSH A08.186.211.132.810.406 – medulla oblongata
- MeSH A08.186.211.132.810.406.286 – area postrema
- MeSH A08.186.211.132.810.406.574 – olivary nucleus
- MeSH A08.186.211.132.810.406.750 – solitary nucleus
- MeSH A08.186.211.132.810.428 – metencephalon
- MeSH A08.186.211.132.810.428.200 – cerebellum
- MeSH A08.186.211.132.810.428.200.212 – cerebellar cortex
- MeSH A08.186.211.132.810.428.200.212.600 – purkinje cells
- MeSH A08.186.211.132.810.428.200.337 – cerebellar nuclei
- MeSH A08.186.211.132.810.428.200.462 – cerebellopontine angle
- MeSH A08.186.211.132.810.428.600 – pons
- MeSH A08.186.211.132.810.428.600.135 – cochlear nucleus
- MeSH A08.186.211.132.810.428.600.500 – locus coeruleus
- MeSH A08.186.211.132.810.428.600.800 – vestibular nuclei
- MeSH A08.186.211.132.810.428.600.800.800 – vestibular nucleus, lateral
- MeSH A08.186.211.132.810.507 – raphe nuclei
- MeSH A08.186.211.132.931 – trigeminal nuclei
- MeSH A08.186.211.132.931.920 – trigeminal nucleus, spinal
- MeSH A08.186.211.132.931.920.927 – trigeminal caudal nucleus
- MeSH A08.186.211.140 – cerebral ventricles
- MeSH A08.186.211.276.187 – cerebral aqueduct
- MeSH A08.186.211.276.298 – choroid plexus
- MeSH A08.186.211.276.460 – ependyma
- MeSH A08.186.211.276.500 – fourth ventricle
- MeSH A08.186.211.276.650 – lateral ventricles
- MeSH A08.186.211.276.814 – septum pellucidum
- MeSH A08.186.211.276.840 – third ventricle
- MeSH A08.186.211.150 – glymphatic system
- MeSH A08.186.211.168 – gray matter
- MeSH A08.186.211.180 – limbic system
- MeSH A08.186.211.180.090 – amygdala
- MeSH A08.186.211.577.200 – epithalamus
- MeSH A08.186.211.577.200.360 – habenula
- MeSH A08.186.211.577.405 – hippocampus
- MeSH A08.186.211.577.405.200 – dentate gyrus
- MeSH A08.186.211.577.405.200.500 – mossy fibers, hippocampal
- MeSH A08.186.211.577.405.700 – pyramidal cells
- MeSH A08.186.211.577.482 – hypothalamus
- MeSH A08.186.211.577.699 – olfactory pathways
- MeSH A08.186.211.577.699.400 – islands of calleja
- MeSH A08.186.211.577.699.573 – olfactory bulb
- MeSH A08.186.211.577.750 – septum of brain
- MeSH A08.186.211.577.750.800 – septal nuclei
- MeSH A08.186.211.577.820 – substantia innominata
- MeSH A08.186.211.730 – prosencephalon
- MeSH A08.186.211.730.385 – diencephalon
- MeSH A08.186.211.730.385.200 – epithalamus
- MeSH A08.186.211.730.385.200.360 – habenula
- MeSH A08.186.211.730.385.200.620 – pineal gland
- MeSH A08.186.211.730.385.357 – hypothalamus
- MeSH A08.186.211.730.385.357.300 – hypothalamic area, lateral
- MeSH A08.186.211.730.385.357.342 – hypothalamus, anterior
- MeSH A08.186.211.730.385.357.342.063 – anterior hypothalamic nucleus
- MeSH A08.186.211.730.385.357.342.400 – paraventricular hypothalamic nucleus
- MeSH A08.186.211.730.385.357.342.450 – preoptic area
- MeSH A08.186.211.730.385.357.342.625 – suprachiasmatic nucleus
- MeSH A08.186.211.730.385.357.342.650 – supraoptic nucleus
- MeSH A08.186.211.730.385.357.352 – hypothalamus, middle
- MeSH A08.186.211.730.385.357.352.081 – arcuate nucleus
- MeSH A08.186.211.730.385.357.352.270 – dorsomedial hypothalamic nucleus
- MeSH A08.186.211.730.385.357.352.435 – hypothalamo-hypophyseal system
- MeSH A08.186.211.730.385.357.352.435.249 – median eminence
- MeSH A08.186.211.730.385.357.352.435.500 – pituitary gland
- MeSH A08.186.211.730.385.357.352.435.500.700 – pituitary gland, anterior
- MeSH A08.186.211.730.385.357.352.435.500.734 – pituitary gland, posterior
- MeSH A08.186.211.730.385.357.352.870 – tuber cinereum
- MeSH A08.186.211.730.385.357.352.953 – ventromedial hypothalamic nucleus
- MeSH A08.186.211.730.385.357.362 – hypothalamus, posterior
- MeSH A08.186.211.730.385.357.362.500 – mamillary bodies
- MeSH A08.186.211.730.385.800 – subthalamus
- MeSH A08.186.211.730.385.800.240 – entopeduncular nucleus
- MeSH A08.186.211.730.385.800.800 – subthalamic nucleus
- MeSH A08.186.211.730.385.826 – thalamus
- MeSH A08.186.211.730.385.826.701 – thalamic nuclei
- MeSH A08.186.211.730.385.826.701.080 – anterior thalamic nuclei
- MeSH A08.186.211.730.385.826.701.444 – geniculate bodies
- MeSH A08.186.211.730.385.826.701.460 – intralaminar thalamic nuclei
- MeSH A08.186.211.730.385.826.701.485 – lateral thalamic nuclei
- MeSH A08.186.211.730.385.826.701.485.600 – pulvinar
- MeSH A08.186.211.730.385.826.701.490 – mediodorsal thalamic nucleus
- MeSH A08.186.211.730.385.826.701.500 – midline thalamic nuclei
- MeSH A08.186.211.730.385.826.701.700 – posterior thalamic nuclei
- MeSH A08.186.211.730.385.826.701.900 – ventral thalamic nuclei
- MeSH A08.186.211.730.885 – telencephalon
- MeSH A08.186.211.730.885.105 – basal ganglia
- MeSH A08.186.211.730.885.105.152 – amygdala
- MeSH A08.186.211.730.885.105.487 – corpus striatum
- MeSH A08.186.211.730.885.105.487.397 – globus pallidus
- MeSH A08.186.211.730.885.105.487.550 – neostriatum
- MeSH A08.186.211.730.885.105.487.550.184 – caudate nucleus
- MeSH A08.186.211.730.885.105.487.550.784 – putamen
- MeSH A08.186.211.730.885.105.683 – nucleus accumbens
- MeSH A08.186.211.730.885.105.880 – substantia innominata
- MeSH A08.186.211.730.885.105.880.100 – basal nucleus of meynert
- MeSH A08.186.211.730.885.213 – cerebral cortex
- MeSH A08.186.211.730.885.213.270 – frontal lobe
- MeSH A08.186.211.730.885.213.270.548 – motor cortex
- MeSH A08.186.211.730.885.213.270.700 – prefrontal cortex
- MeSH A08.186.211.730.885.213.420 – neocortex
- MeSH A08.186.211.730.885.213.571 – occipital lobe
- MeSH A08.186.211.730.885.213.571.735 – visual cortex
- MeSH A08.186.211.730.885.213.670 – parietal lobe
- MeSH A08.186.211.730.885.213.670.675 – somatosensory cortex
- MeSH A08.186.211.730.885.213.766 – pyramidal cells
- MeSH A08.186.211.730.885.213.863 – temporal lobe
- MeSH A08.186.211.730.885.213.863.297 – auditory cortex
- MeSH A08.186.211.730.885.213.863.648 – parahippocampal gyrus
- MeSH A08.186.211.730.885.213.863.648.225 – entorhinal cortex
- MeSH A08.186.211.730.885.362 – corpus callosum
- MeSH A08.186.211.730.885.380 – diagonal band of broca
- MeSH A08.186.211.730.885.400 – fornix (brain)
- MeSH A08.186.211.730.885.435 – internal capsule
- MeSH A08.186.211.730.885.440 – islands of calleja
- MeSH A08.186.211.730.885.600 – olfactory pathways
- MeSH A08.186.211.730.885.600.400 – islands of calleja
- MeSH A08.186.211.730.885.600.573 – olfactory bulb
- MeSH A08.186.211.730.885.750 – septum of brain
- MeSH A08.186.211.730.885.750.800 – septal nuclei
- MeSH A08.186.211.730.885.750.814 – septum pellucidum
- MeSH A08.186.211.204 – white matter

==== MeSH A08.186.566 – meninges ====
- MeSH A08.186.566.166 – arachnoid
- MeSH A08.186.566.166.686 – subarachnoid space
- MeSH A08.186.566.166.686.351 – cisterna magna
- MeSH A08.186.566.395 – dura mater
- MeSH A08.186.566.395.687 – subdural space
- MeSH A08.186.566.731 – pia mater

==== MeSH A08.186.854 – spinal cord ====
- MeSH A08.186.854.080 – anterior horn cells
- MeSH A08.186.854.253 – extrapyramidal tracts
- MeSH A08.186.854.610 – posterior horn cells
- MeSH A08.186.854.610.800 – substantia gelatinosa
- MeSH A08.186.854.633 – pyramidal tracts
- MeSH A08.186.854.761 – spinothalamic tracts

=== MeSH A08.340 – ganglia ===
==== MeSH A08.340.315 – ganglia, autonomic ====
- MeSH A08.340.315.300 – ganglia, parasympathetic
- MeSH A08.340.315.350 – ganglia, sympathetic
- MeSH A08.340.315.350.800 – stellate ganglion
- MeSH A08.340.315.350.850 – superior cervical ganglion

==== MeSH A08.340.390 – ganglia, sensory ====
- MeSH A08.340.390.340 – ganglia, spinal
- MeSH A08.340.390.380 – geniculate ganglion
- MeSH A08.340.390.550 – nodose ganglion
- MeSH A08.340.390.800 – spiral ganglion
- MeSH A08.340.390.850 – trigeminal ganglion

=== MeSH A08.612 – neural pathways ===
==== MeSH A08.612.220 – afferent pathways ====
- MeSH A08.612.220.110 – auditory pathways
- MeSH A08.612.220.640 – olfactory pathways
- MeSH A08.612.220.725 – spinocerebellar tracts
- MeSH A08.612.220.735 – spinothalamic tracts
- MeSH A08.612.220.830 – visceral afferents
- MeSH A08.612.220.860 – visual pathways

==== MeSH A08.612.380 – efferent pathways ====
- MeSH A08.612.380.239 – extrapyramidal tracts
- MeSH A08.612.380.730 – pyramidal tracts

=== MeSH A08.637 – neuroglia ===
==== MeSH A08.637.500 – neuropil ====
- MeSH A08.637.500.550 – neuropil threads

==== MeSH A08.637.600 – oligodendroglia ====
- MeSH A08.637.600.500 – myelin sheath

==== MeSH A08.637.800 – schwann cells ====
- MeSH A08.637.800.500 – myelin sheath
- MeSH A08.637.800.500.550 – neurilemma
- MeSH A08.637.800.500.700 – ranvier's nodes

=== MeSH A08.663 – neurons ===
==== MeSH A08.663.256 – dendrites ====
- MeSH A08.663.256.200 – dendritic spines
- MeSH A08.663.256.500 – neurites

==== MeSH A08.663.358 – interneurons ====
- MeSH A08.663.358.050 – amacrine cells
- MeSH A08.663.358.700 – retinal bipolar cells

==== MeSH A08.663.542 – nerve fibers ====
- MeSH A08.663.542.075 – adrenergic fibers
- MeSH A08.663.542.075.800 – sympathetic fibers, postganglionic
- MeSH A08.663.542.100 – autonomic fibers, postganglionic
- MeSH A08.663.542.100.700 – parasympathetic fibers, postganglionic
- MeSH A08.663.542.100.800 – sympathetic fibers, postganglionic
- MeSH A08.663.542.122 – autonomic fibers, preganglionic
- MeSH A08.663.542.145 – axons
- MeSH A08.663.542.145.500 – neurites
- MeSH A08.663.542.145.750 – presynaptic terminals
- MeSH A08.663.542.145.750.500 – mossy fibers, hippocampal
- MeSH A08.663.542.234 – cholinergic fibers
- MeSH A08.663.542.234.060 – autonomic fibers, preganglionic
- MeSH A08.663.542.234.700 – parasympathetic fibers, postganglionic
- MeSH A08.663.542.512 – nerve fibers, myelinated
- MeSH A08.663.542.512.560 – myelin sheath
- MeSH A08.663.542.512.560.550 – neurilemma
- MeSH A08.663.542.512.560.700 – ranvier's nodes
- MeSH A08.663.542.756 – nerve fibers, unmyelinated

==== MeSH A08.663.609 – neurofibrils ====
- MeSH A08.663.609.520 – neurofibrillary tangles

==== MeSH A08.663.650 – neurons, afferent ====
- MeSH A08.663.650.250 – hair cells
- MeSH A08.663.650.250.250 – hair cells, inner
- MeSH A08.663.650.250.315 – hair cells, outer
- MeSH A08.663.650.250.380 – hair cells, vestibular
- MeSH A08.663.650.540 – olfactory receptor neurons
- MeSH A08.663.650.650 – photoreceptors
- MeSH A08.663.650.650.650 – photoreceptors, invertebrate
- MeSH A08.663.650.650.670 – photoreceptors, vertebrate
- MeSH A08.663.650.650.670.100 – cones
- MeSH A08.663.650.650.670.650 – rods
- MeSH A08.663.650.650.670.650.650 – rod outer segments
- MeSH A08.663.650.650.835 – retinal ganglion cells
- MeSH A08.663.650.675 – posterior horn cells
- MeSH A08.663.650.675.800 – substantia gelatinosa
- MeSH A08.663.650.700 – retinal ganglion cells

==== MeSH A08.663.655 – neurons, efferent ====
- MeSH A08.663.655.500 – motor neurons
- MeSH A08.663.655.500.050 – anterior horn cells
- MeSH A08.663.655.500.525 – motor neurons, gamma

==== MeSH A08.663.703 – neuropil ====
- MeSH A08.663.703.550 – neuropil threads

=== MeSH A08.713 – neurosecretory systems ===
==== MeSH A08.713.357 – hypothalamo-hypophyseal system ====
- MeSH A08.713.357.500 – median eminence
- MeSH A08.713.357.750 – pituitary gland
- MeSH A08.713.357.750.700 – pituitary gland, anterior
- MeSH A08.713.357.750.734 – pituitary gland, posterior

=== MeSH A08.800 – peripheral nervous system ===
==== MeSH A08.800.050 – autonomic nervous system ====
- MeSH A08.800.050.050 – autonomic pathways
- MeSH A08.800.050.050.050 – autonomic fibers, postganglionic
- MeSH A08.800.050.050.050.700 – parasympathetic fibers, postganglionic
- MeSH A08.800.050.050.050.800 – sympathetic fibers, postganglionic
- MeSH A08.800.050.050.060 – autonomic fibers, preganglionic
- MeSH A08.800.050.050.150 – celiac plexus
- MeSH A08.800.050.050.400 – hypogastric plexus
- MeSH A08.800.050.050.500 – myenteric plexus
- MeSH A08.800.050.050.800 – splanchnic nerves
- MeSH A08.800.050.050.850 – submucous plexus
- MeSH A08.800.050.050.925 – vagus nerve
- MeSH A08.800.050.050.925.450 – laryngeal nerves
- MeSH A08.800.050.050.925.450.700 – recurrent laryngeal nerve
- MeSH A08.800.050.050.925.550 – nodose ganglion
- MeSH A08.800.050.150 – enteric nervous system
- MeSH A08.800.050.150.500 – myenteric plexus
- MeSH A08.800.050.150.750 – submucous plexus
- MeSH A08.800.050.300 – ganglia, autonomic
- MeSH A08.800.050.300.250 – ganglia, parasympathetic
- MeSH A08.800.050.300.300 – ganglia, sympathetic
- MeSH A08.800.050.300.300.800 – stellate ganglion
- MeSH A08.800.050.300.300.850 – superior cervical ganglion
- MeSH A08.800.050.600 – parasympathetic nervous system
- MeSH A08.800.050.600.300 – ganglia, parasympathetic
- MeSH A08.800.050.600.650 – parasympathetic fibers, postganglionic
- MeSH A08.800.050.600.825 – vagus nerve
- MeSH A08.800.050.600.825.450 – laryngeal nerves
- MeSH A08.800.050.600.825.450.700 – recurrent laryngeal nerve
- MeSH A08.800.050.600.825.550 – nodose ganglion
- MeSH A08.800.050.800 – sympathetic nervous system
- MeSH A08.800.050.800.300 – ganglia, sympathetic
- MeSH A08.800.050.800.300.800 – stellate ganglion
- MeSH A08.800.050.800.300.850 – superior cervical ganglion
- MeSH A08.800.050.800.800 – splanchnic nerves
- MeSH A08.800.050.800.900 – vasomotor system
- MeSH A08.800.050.800.900.700 – pressoreceptors

==== MeSH A08.800.350 – ganglia, sensory ====
- MeSH A08.800.350.340 – ganglia, spinal
- MeSH A08.800.350.380 – geniculate ganglion
- MeSH A08.800.350.550 – nodose ganglion
- MeSH A08.800.350.800 – spiral ganglion
- MeSH A08.800.350.850 – trigeminal ganglion

==== MeSH A08.800.550 – nerve endings ====
- MeSH A08.800.550.550 – neuroeffector junction
- MeSH A08.800.550.550.550 – neuromuscular junction
- MeSH A08.800.550.550.550.500 – motor endplate
- MeSH A08.800.550.700 – receptors, sensory
- MeSH A08.800.550.700.120 – chemoreceptors
- MeSH A08.800.550.700.120.530 – neuroepithelial cells
- MeSH A08.800.550.700.120.530.550 – neuroepithelial bodies
- MeSH A08.800.550.700.120.540 – olfactory receptor neurons
- MeSH A08.800.550.700.120.600 – paraganglia, nonchromaffin
- MeSH A08.800.550.700.120.600.050 – aortic bodies
- MeSH A08.800.550.700.120.600.150 – carotid body
- MeSH A08.800.550.700.120.600.350 – glomus jugulare
- MeSH A08.800.550.700.120.600.360 – glomus tympanicum
- MeSH A08.800.550.700.120.800 – taste buds
- MeSH A08.800.550.700.500 – mechanoreceptors
- MeSH A08.800.550.700.500.300 – golgi-mazzoni corpuscles
- MeSH A08.800.550.700.500.425 – merkel cells
- MeSH A08.800.550.700.500.500 – muscle spindles
- MeSH A08.800.550.700.500.600 – neuroepithelial cells
- MeSH A08.800.550.700.500.600.350 – hair cells
- MeSH A08.800.550.700.500.600.350.350 – hair cells, inner
- MeSH A08.800.550.700.500.600.350.365 – hair cells, outer
- MeSH A08.800.550.700.500.600.350.380 – hair cells, vestibular
- MeSH A08.800.550.700.500.700 – pacinian corpuscles
- MeSH A08.800.550.700.500.750 – pressoreceptors
- MeSH A08.800.550.700.500.780 – pulmonary stretch receptors
- MeSH A08.800.550.700.650 – nociceptors
- MeSH A08.800.550.700.730 – photoreceptors
- MeSH A08.800.550.700.730.650 – photoreceptors, invertebrate
- MeSH A08.800.550.700.730.670 – photoreceptors, vertebrate
- MeSH A08.800.550.700.730.670.100 – cones
- MeSH A08.800.550.700.730.670.650 – rods
- MeSH A08.800.550.700.730.670.650.650 – rod outer segments
- MeSH A08.800.550.700.840 – thermoreceptors

==== MeSH A08.800.800 – peripheral nerves ====
- MeSH A08.800.800.060 – autonomic pathways
- MeSH A08.800.800.060.050 – autonomic fibers, postganglionic
- MeSH A08.800.800.060.050.700 – parasympathetic fibers, postganglionic
- MeSH A08.800.800.060.050.800 – sympathetic fibers, postganglionic
- MeSH A08.800.800.060.060 – autonomic fibers, preganglionic
- MeSH A08.800.800.060.150 – celiac plexus
- MeSH A08.800.800.060.400 – hypogastric plexus
- MeSH A08.800.800.060.500 – myenteric plexus
- MeSH A08.800.800.060.800 – splanchnic nerves
- MeSH A08.800.800.060.840 – submucous plexus
- MeSH A08.800.800.060.920 – vagus nerve
- MeSH A08.800.800.060.920.450 – laryngeal nerves
- MeSH A08.800.800.060.920.450.700 – recurrent laryngeal nerve
- MeSH A08.800.800.060.920.550 – nodose ganglion
- MeSH A08.800.800.090 – blood-nerve barrier
- MeSH A08.800.800.120 – cranial nerves
- MeSH A08.800.800.120.030 – abducens nerve
- MeSH A08.800.800.120.060 – accessory nerve
- MeSH A08.800.800.120.250 – facial nerve
- MeSH A08.800.800.120.250.120 – chorda tympani nerve
- MeSH A08.800.800.120.250.280 – geniculate ganglion
- MeSH A08.800.800.120.290 – glossopharyngeal nerve
- MeSH A08.800.800.120.330 – hypoglossal nerve
- MeSH A08.800.800.120.600 – oculomotor nerve
- MeSH A08.800.800.120.640 – olfactory nerve
- MeSH A08.800.800.120.680 – optic nerve
- MeSH A08.800.800.120.680.600 – optic chiasm
- MeSH A08.800.800.120.680.660 – optic disk
- MeSH A08.800.800.120.760 – trigeminal nerve
- MeSH A08.800.800.120.760.500 – mandibular nerve
- MeSH A08.800.800.120.760.500.450 – lingual nerve
- MeSH A08.800.800.120.760.550 – maxillary nerve
- MeSH A08.800.800.120.760.650 – ophthalmic nerve
- MeSH A08.800.800.120.760.825 – trigeminal ganglion
- MeSH A08.800.800.120.800 – trochlear nerve
- MeSH A08.800.800.120.900 – vagus nerve
- MeSH A08.800.800.120.900.450 – laryngeal nerves
- MeSH A08.800.800.120.900.450.700 – recurrent laryngeal nerve
- MeSH A08.800.800.120.900.550 – nodose ganglion
- MeSH A08.800.800.120.910 – vestibulocochlear nerve
- MeSH A08.800.800.120.910.120 – cochlear nerve
- MeSH A08.800.800.120.910.120.800 – spiral ganglion
- MeSH A08.800.800.120.910.900 – vestibular nerve
- MeSH A08.800.800.690 – schwann cells
- MeSH A08.800.800.690.500 – myelin sheath
- MeSH A08.800.800.690.500.550 – neurilemma
- MeSH A08.800.800.690.500.700 – ranvier's nodes
- MeSH A08.800.800.720 – spinal nerves
- MeSH A08.800.800.720.050 – brachial plexus
- MeSH A08.800.800.720.050.500 – median nerve
- MeSH A08.800.800.720.050.540 – musculocutaneous nerve
- MeSH A08.800.800.720.050.700 – radial nerve
- MeSH A08.800.800.720.050.850 – ulnar nerve
- MeSH A08.800.800.720.150 – cervical plexus
- MeSH A08.800.800.720.150.700 – phrenic nerve
- MeSH A08.800.800.720.450 – lumbosacral plexus
- MeSH A08.800.800.720.450.250 – femoral nerve
- MeSH A08.800.800.720.450.600 – obturator nerve
- MeSH A08.800.800.720.450.760 – sciatic nerve
- MeSH A08.800.800.720.450.760.640 – peroneal nerve
- MeSH A08.800.800.720.450.760.820 – tibial nerve
- MeSH A08.800.800.720.450.760.820.820 – sural nerve
- MeSH A08.800.800.720.725 – spinal nerve roots
- MeSH A08.800.800.720.725.150 – cauda equina
- MeSH A08.800.800.720.725.350 – ganglia, spinal
- MeSH A08.800.800.720.800 – thoracic nerves
- MeSH A08.800.800.720.800.350 – intercostal nerves

=== MeSH A08.850 – synapses ===
==== MeSH A08.850.550 – neuroeffector junction ====
- MeSH A08.850.550.550 – neuromuscular junction
- MeSH A08.850.550.550.500 – motor endplate

==== MeSH A08.850.700 – presynaptic terminals ====
- MeSH A08.850.700.500 – mossy fibers, hippocampal

==== MeSH A08.850.840 – synaptic vesicles ====
The list continues at List of MeSH codes (A09).
