= List of MeSH codes (A11) =

The following is a partial list of the "A" codes for Medical Subject Headings (MeSH), as defined by the United States National Library of Medicine (NLM).

This list continues the information at List of MeSH codes (A10). Codes following these are found at List of MeSH codes (A12). For other MeSH codes, see List of MeSH codes.

The source for this content is the set of 2006 MeSH Trees from the NLM.

== MeSH A11 – cells ==
=== MeSH A11.063 – antibody-producing cells ===
==== MeSH A11.063.438 – b-lymphocytes ====
- MeSH A11.063.438.450 – b-lymphocyte subsets
- MeSH A11.063.438.725 – plasma cells

=== MeSH A11.066 – antigen-presenting cells ===
==== MeSH A11.066.270 – dendritic cells ====
- MeSH A11.066.270.500 – langerhans cells

=== MeSH A11.118 – blood cells ===
==== MeSH A11.118.290 – erythrocytes ====
- MeSH A11.118.290.270 – erythrocyte membrane
- MeSH A11.118.290.330 – erythrocytes, abnormal
- MeSH A11.118.290.330.100 – acanthocytes
- MeSH A11.118.290.330.315 – erythrocyte inclusions
- MeSH A11.118.290.330.315.335 – heinz bodies
- MeSH A11.118.290.330.531 – megaloblasts
- MeSH A11.118.290.330.802 – spherocytes
- MeSH A11.118.290.760 – reticulocytes

==== MeSH A11.118.637 – leukocytes ====
- MeSH A11.118.637.415 – granulocytes
- MeSH A11.118.637.415.120 – basophils
- MeSH A11.118.637.415.345 – eosinophils
- MeSH A11.118.637.415.583 – neutrophils
- MeSH A11.118.637.555 – leukocytes, mononuclear
- MeSH A11.118.637.555.567 – lymphocytes
- MeSH A11.118.637.555.567.532 – killer cells
- MeSH A11.118.637.555.567.537 – killer cells, natural
- MeSH A11.118.637.555.567.537.500 – killer cells, lymphokine-activated
- MeSH A11.118.637.555.567.550 – lymphocyte subsets
- MeSH A11.118.637.555.567.550.450 – b-lymphocyte subsets
- MeSH A11.118.637.555.567.550.500 – t-lymphocyte subsets
- MeSH A11.118.637.555.567.562 – b-lymphocytes
- MeSH A11.118.637.555.567.562.450 – b-lymphocyte subsets
- MeSH A11.118.637.555.567.562.725 – plasma cells
- MeSH A11.118.637.555.567.569 – t-lymphocytes
- MeSH A11.118.637.555.567.569.200 – cd4-positive t-lymphocytes
- MeSH A11.118.637.555.567.569.200.400 – t-lymphocytes, helper-inducer
- MeSH A11.118.637.555.567.569.200.400.900 – th1 cells
- MeSH A11.118.637.555.567.569.200.400.905 – th2 cells
- MeSH A11.118.637.555.567.569.220 – cd8-positive t-lymphocytes
- MeSH A11.118.637.555.567.569.220.200 – t-lymphocytes, cytotoxic
- MeSH A11.118.637.555.567.569.500 – t-lymphocyte subsets
- MeSH A11.118.637.555.567.622 – lymphocytes, null
- MeSH A11.118.637.555.567.650 – lymphocytes, tumor-infiltrating
- MeSH A11.118.637.555.652 – monocytes
- MeSH A11.118.637.555.652.500 – monocytes, activated killer

=== MeSH A11.148 – bone marrow cells ===
==== MeSH A11.148.350 – granulocytes ====
- MeSH A11.148.350.350 – granulocyte precursor cells

==== MeSH A11.148.378 – hematopoietic stem cells ====
- MeSH A11.148.378.590 – myeloid progenitor cells
- MeSH A11.148.378.590.249 – erythroid progenitor cells
- MeSH A11.148.378.590.249.200 – erythroblasts
- MeSH A11.148.378.590.249.200.500 – megaloblasts
- MeSH A11.148.378.590.249.480 – megakaryocytes
- MeSH A11.148.378.590.249.760 – reticulocytes
- MeSH A11.148.378.590.350 – granulocyte precursor cells

=== MeSH A11.251 – cells, cultured ===
==== MeSH A11.251.210 – cell line ====
- MeSH A11.251.210.172 – cell line, transformed
- MeSH A11.251.210.172.500 – cos cells
- MeSH A11.251.210.190 – cell line, tumor
- MeSH A11.251.210.190.160 – Caco-2 cells
- MeSH A11.251.210.190.380 – hct116 cells
- MeSH A11.251.210.190.400 – HeLa cells
- MeSH A11.251.210.190.400.500 – kb cells
- MeSH A11.251.210.190.465 – hl-60 cells
- MeSH A11.251.210.190.475 – ht29 cells
- MeSH A11.251.210.190.495 – jurkat cells
- MeSH A11.251.210.190.510 – k562 cells
- MeSH A11.251.210.190.750 – pc12 cells
- MeSH A11.251.210.190.880 – u937 cells
- MeSH A11.251.210.200 – CHO cells
- MeSH A11.251.210.505 – l cells (cell line)
- MeSH A11.251.210.520 – llc-pk1 cells
- MeSH A11.251.210.700 – 3t3 cells
- MeSH A11.251.210.700.080 – balb 3t3 cells
- MeSH A11.251.210.700.550 – nih 3t3 cells
- MeSH A11.251.210.700.775 – Swiss 3t3 cells
- MeSH A11.251.210.700.775.800 – 3T3-L1 cells
- MeSH A11.251.210.955 – vero cells

==== MeSH A11.251.353 – clone cells ====
- MeSH A11.251.353.485 – hybridomas

==== MeSH A11.251.600 – hybrid cells ====
- MeSH A11.251.600.485 – hybridomas

==== MeSH A11.251.860 – tumor cells, cultured ====
- MeSH A11.251.860.180 – cell line, tumor
- MeSH A11.251.860.180.160 – caco-2 cells
- MeSH A11.251.860.180.380 – hct116 cells
- MeSH A11.251.860.180.400 – hela cells
- MeSH A11.251.860.180.400.500 – kb cells
- MeSH A11.251.860.180.465 – hl-60 cells
- MeSH A11.251.860.180.475 – ht29 cells
- MeSH A11.251.860.180.495 – jurkat cells
- MeSH A11.251.860.180.510 – k562 cells
- MeSH A11.251.860.180.750 – pc12 cells
- MeSH A11.251.860.180.880 – u937 cells

=== MeSH A11.284 – cellular structures ===
==== MeSH A11.284.149 – cell membrane ====
- MeSH A11.284.149.165 – cell membrane structures
- MeSH A11.284.149.165.165 – cell-matrix junctions
- MeSH A11.284.149.165.165.285 – focal adhesions
- MeSH A11.284.149.165.165.360 – hemidesmosomes
- MeSH A11.284.149.165.175 – coated pits, cell-membrane
- MeSH A11.284.149.165.175.160 – caveolae
- MeSH A11.284.149.165.355 – glycocalyx
- MeSH A11.284.149.165.420 – intercellular junctions
- MeSH A11.284.149.165.420.020 – adherens junctions
- MeSH A11.284.149.165.420.297 – desmosomes
- MeSH A11.284.149.165.420.471 – gap junctions
- MeSH A11.284.149.165.420.625 – plasmodesmata
- MeSH A11.284.149.165.420.780 – synapses
- MeSH A11.284.149.165.420.780.550 – neuroeffector junction
- MeSH A11.284.149.165.420.780.550.550 – neuromuscular junction
- MeSH A11.284.149.165.420.780.550.550.500 – motor endplate
- MeSH A11.284.149.165.420.780.700 – presynaptic terminals
- MeSH A11.284.149.165.420.780.800 – synaptic membranes
- MeSH A11.284.149.165.420.820 – tight junctions
- MeSH A11.284.149.165.570 – membrane microdomains
- MeSH A11.284.149.165.570.160 – caveolae
- MeSH A11.284.149.165.600 – myelin sheath
- MeSH A11.284.149.165.630 – nuclear envelope
- MeSH A11.284.149.165.630.500 – nuclear lamina
- MeSH A11.284.149.165.695 – phycobilisomes
- MeSH A11.284.149.165.760 – ranvier's nodes
- MeSH A11.284.149.356 – erythrocyte membrane
- MeSH A11.284.149.450 – intracellular membranes
- MeSH A11.284.149.450.349 – mitochondrial membranes
- MeSH A11.284.149.450.700 – nuclear envelope
- MeSH A11.284.149.648 – purple membrane
- MeSH A11.284.149.707 – sarcolemma
- MeSH A11.284.149.844 – synaptic membranes

==== MeSH A11.284.180 – cell surface extensions ====
- MeSH A11.284.180.075 – axons
- MeSH A11.284.180.075.249 – growth cones
- MeSH A11.284.180.120 – cellulosomes
- MeSH A11.284.180.165 – cilia
- MeSH A11.284.180.225 – dendrites
- MeSH A11.284.180.225.169 – dendritic spines
- MeSH A11.284.180.225.340 – growth cones
- MeSH A11.284.180.285 – fimbriae, bacterial
- MeSH A11.284.180.290 – flagella
- MeSH A11.284.180.290.835 – sperm tail
- MeSH A11.284.180.565 – microvilli
- MeSH A11.284.180.610 – neurites
- MeSH A11.284.180.610.345 – growth cones
- MeSH A11.284.180.690 – pili, sex
- MeSH A11.284.180.700 – pseudopodia

==== MeSH A11.284.183 – cell wall ====
- MeSH A11.284.183.200 – cell wall skeleton

==== MeSH A11.284.187 – chromosomes ====
- MeSH A11.284.187.167 – chromosomes, archaeal
- MeSH A11.284.187.178 – chromosomes, artificial
- MeSH A11.284.187.178.170 – chromosomes, artificial, bacterial
- MeSH A11.284.187.178.190 – chromosomes, artificial, mammalian
- MeSH A11.284.187.178.190.117 – chromosomes, artificial, human
- MeSH A11.284.187.178.195 – chromosomes, artificial, p1 bacteriophage
- MeSH A11.284.187.178.200 – chromosomes, artificial, yeast
- MeSH A11.284.187.190 – chromosomes, bacterial
- MeSH A11.284.187.190.170 – chromosomes, artificial, bacterial
- MeSH A11.284.187.360 – chromosomes, fungal
- MeSH A11.284.187.360.800 – chromosomes, artificial, yeast
- MeSH A11.284.187.520 – chromosomes, mammalian
- MeSH A11.284.187.520.190 – chromosomes, artificial, mammalian
- MeSH A11.284.187.520.190.117 – chromosomes, artificial, human
- MeSH A11.284.187.520.300 – chromosomes, human
- MeSH A11.284.187.520.300.117 – chromosomes, artificial, human
- MeSH A11.284.187.520.300.235 – chromosomes, human, 1-3
- MeSH A11.284.187.520.300.235.240 – chromosomes, human, pair 1
- MeSH A11.284.187.520.300.235.245 – chromosomes, human, pair 2
- MeSH A11.284.187.520.300.235.250 – chromosomes, human, pair 3
- MeSH A11.284.187.520.300.280 – chromosomes, human, 4-5
- MeSH A11.284.187.520.300.280.285 – chromosomes, human, pair 4
- MeSH A11.284.187.520.300.280.290 – chromosomes, human, pair 5
- MeSH A11.284.187.520.300.325 – chromosomes, human, 6-12 and x
- MeSH A11.284.187.520.300.325.330 – chromosomes, human, pair 6
- MeSH A11.284.187.520.300.325.335 – chromosomes, human, pair 7
- MeSH A11.284.187.520.300.325.340 – chromosomes, human, pair 8
- MeSH A11.284.187.520.300.325.345 – chromosomes, human, pair 9
- MeSH A11.284.187.520.300.325.345.500 – philadelphia chromosome
- MeSH A11.284.187.520.300.325.350 – chromosomes, human, pair 10
- MeSH A11.284.187.520.300.325.355 – chromosomes, human, pair 11
- MeSH A11.284.187.520.300.325.360 – chromosomes, human, pair 12
- MeSH A11.284.187.520.300.325.680 – chromosomes, human, x
- MeSH A11.284.187.520.300.370 – chromosomes, human, 13-15
- MeSH A11.284.187.520.300.370.375 – chromosomes, human, pair 13
- MeSH A11.284.187.520.300.370.380 – chromosomes, human, pair 14
- MeSH A11.284.187.520.300.370.385 – chromosomes, human, pair 15
- MeSH A11.284.187.520.300.415 – chromosomes, human, 16-18
- MeSH A11.284.187.520.300.415.420 – chromosomes, human, pair 16
- MeSH A11.284.187.520.300.415.425 – chromosomes, human, pair 17
- MeSH A11.284.187.520.300.415.430 – chromosomes, human, pair 18
- MeSH A11.284.187.520.300.460 – chromosomes, human, 19-20
- MeSH A11.284.187.520.300.460.465 – chromosomes, human, pair 19
- MeSH A11.284.187.520.300.460.470 – chromosomes, human, pair 20
- MeSH A11.284.187.520.300.505 – chromosomes, human, 21-22 and y
- MeSH A11.284.187.520.300.505.510 – chromosomes, human, pair 21
- MeSH A11.284.187.520.300.505.515 – chromosomes, human, pair 22
- MeSH A11.284.187.520.300.505.515.500 – philadelphia chromosome
- MeSH A11.284.187.520.300.505.757 – chromosomes, human, y
- MeSH A11.284.187.560 – chromosomes, plant
- MeSH A11.284.187.570 – isochromosomes
- MeSH A11.284.187.788 – ring chromosomes
- MeSH A11.284.187.865 – sex chromosomes
- MeSH A11.284.187.865.800 – sex chromatin
- MeSH A11.284.187.865.982 – x chromosome
- MeSH A11.284.187.865.982.500 – chromosomes, human, x
- MeSH A11.284.187.865.983 – y chromosome
- MeSH A11.284.187.865.983.500 – chromosomes, human, y

==== MeSH A11.284.295 – extracellular space ====
- MeSH A11.284.295.260 – extracellular fluid
- MeSH A11.284.295.310 – extracellular matrix
- MeSH A11.284.295.310.279 – glomerular basement membrane
- MeSH A11.284.295.310.560 – microfibrils
- MeSH A11.284.295.310.990 – zona pellucida
- MeSH A11.284.295.680 – periplasm

==== MeSH A11.284.420 – inclusion bodies ====
- MeSH A11.284.420.204 – erythrocyte inclusions
- MeSH A11.284.420.204.335 – heinz bodies
- MeSH A11.284.420.390 – inclusion bodies, viral
- MeSH A11.284.420.400 – intranuclear inclusion bodies
- MeSH A11.284.420.460 – lewy bodies

==== MeSH A11.284.430 – intracellular space ====
- MeSH A11.284.430.106 – cell nucleus
- MeSH A11.284.430.106.279 – cell nucleus structures
- MeSH A11.284.430.106.279.345 – intranuclear space
- MeSH A11.284.430.106.279.345.175 – cell nucleolus
- MeSH A11.284.430.106.279.345.190 – chromosomes
- MeSH A11.284.430.106.279.345.190.160 – chromosome structures
- MeSH A11.284.430.106.279.345.190.160.165 – centromere
- MeSH A11.284.430.106.279.345.190.160.165.500 – kinetochores
- MeSH A11.284.430.106.279.345.190.160.175 – chromatids
- MeSH A11.284.430.106.279.345.190.160.180 – chromatin
- MeSH A11.284.430.106.279.345.190.160.180.270 – euchromatin
- MeSH A11.284.430.106.279.345.190.160.180.383 – heterochromatin
- MeSH A11.284.430.106.279.345.190.160.180.383.800 – sex chromatin
- MeSH A11.284.430.106.279.345.190.160.180.625 – nucleosomes
- MeSH A11.284.430.106.279.345.190.160.650 – nucleolus organizer region
- MeSH A11.284.430.106.279.345.190.160.830 – synaptonemal complex
- MeSH A11.284.430.106.279.345.190.160.845 – telomere
- MeSH A11.284.430.106.279.345.195 – coiled bodies
- MeSH A11.284.430.106.279.345.700 – nuclear matrix
- MeSH A11.284.430.106.279.345.700.700 – nuclear lamina
- MeSH A11.284.430.106.279.345.850 – spliceosomes
- MeSH A11.284.430.106.279.692 – nuclear envelope
- MeSH A11.284.430.106.279.692.314 – nuclear lamina
- MeSH A11.284.430.106.279.692.630 – nuclear pore
- MeSH A11.284.430.106.550 – macronucleus
- MeSH A11.284.430.106.570 – micronuclei, chromosome-defective
- MeSH A11.284.430.106.575 – micronucleus, germline
- MeSH A11.284.430.214 – cytoplasm
- MeSH A11.284.430.214.190 – cytoplasmic structures
- MeSH A11.284.430.214.190.500 – cytoplasmic granules
- MeSH A11.284.430.214.190.500.207 – chromaffin granules
- MeSH A11.284.430.214.190.500.560 – melanosomes
- MeSH A11.284.430.214.190.500.585 – microbodies
- MeSH A11.284.430.214.190.500.585.250 – glyoxysomes
- MeSH A11.284.430.214.190.500.585.600 – peroxisomes
- MeSH A11.284.430.214.190.500.610 – nissl bodies
- MeSH A11.284.430.214.190.500.950 – weibel-palade bodies
- MeSH A11.284.430.214.190.750 – cytoskeleton
- MeSH A11.284.430.214.190.750.410 – intermediate filaments
- MeSH A11.284.430.214.190.750.510 – microfilaments
- MeSH A11.284.430.214.190.750.510.830 – stress fibers
- MeSH A11.284.430.214.190.750.585 – microtubule-organizing center
- MeSH A11.284.430.214.190.750.585.160 – centrosome
- MeSH A11.284.430.214.190.750.585.160.130 – centrioles
- MeSH A11.284.430.214.190.750.602 – microtubules
- MeSH A11.284.430.214.190.750.602.620 – neuropil threads
- MeSH A11.284.430.214.190.750.610 – mitotic spindle apparatus
- MeSH A11.284.430.214.190.750.620 – myofibrils
- MeSH A11.284.430.214.190.750.640 – neurofibrils
- MeSH A11.284.430.214.190.750.640.520 – neurofibrillary tangles
- MeSH A11.284.430.214.190.875 – organelles
- MeSH A11.284.430.214.190.875.080 – bacterial chromatophores
- MeSH A11.284.430.214.190.875.117 – cell nucleus
- MeSH A11.284.430.214.190.875.117.550 – macronucleus
- MeSH A11.284.430.214.190.875.117.570 – micronuclei, chromosome-defective
- MeSH A11.284.430.214.190.875.117.575 – micronucleus, germline
- MeSH A11.284.430.214.190.875.190 – cytoplasmic vesicles
- MeSH A11.284.430.214.190.875.190.190 – cytoplasmic granules
- MeSH A11.284.430.214.190.875.190.190.207 – chromaffin granules
- MeSH A11.284.430.214.190.875.190.190.560 – melanosomes
- MeSH A11.284.430.214.190.875.190.190.755 – microbodies
- MeSH A11.284.430.214.190.875.190.190.755.250 – glyoxysomes
- MeSH A11.284.430.214.190.875.190.190.755.600 – peroxisomes
- MeSH A11.284.430.214.190.875.190.190.950 – weibel-palade bodies
- MeSH A11.284.430.214.190.875.190.250 – endosomes
- MeSH A11.284.430.214.190.875.190.550 – lysosomes
- MeSH A11.284.430.214.190.875.190.550.040 – acrosome
- MeSH A11.284.430.214.190.875.190.700 – phagosomes
- MeSH A11.284.430.214.190.875.190.880 – transport vesicles
- MeSH A11.284.430.214.190.875.190.880.180 – coated vesicles
- MeSH A11.284.430.214.190.875.190.880.180.160 – caveolae
- MeSH A11.284.430.214.190.875.190.880.180.170 – clathrin-coated vesicles
- MeSH A11.284.430.214.190.875.190.880.180.180 – cop-coated vesicles
- MeSH A11.284.430.214.190.875.190.880.810 – secretory vesicles
- MeSH A11.284.430.214.190.875.190.880.830 – synaptic vesicles
- MeSH A11.284.430.214.190.875.190.920 – vacuoles
- MeSH A11.284.430.214.190.875.248 – endoplasmic reticulum
- MeSH A11.284.430.214.190.875.248.300 – endoplasmic reticulum, rough
- MeSH A11.284.430.214.190.875.248.300.610 – nissl bodies
- MeSH A11.284.430.214.190.875.248.310 – endoplasmic reticulum, smooth
- MeSH A11.284.430.214.190.875.248.310.800 – sarcoplasmic reticulum
- MeSH A11.284.430.214.190.875.336 – golgi apparatus
- MeSH A11.284.430.214.190.875.336.850 – trans-golgi network
- MeSH A11.284.430.214.190.875.564 – mitochondria
- MeSH A11.284.430.214.190.875.564.461 – mitochondria, liver
- MeSH A11.284.430.214.190.875.564.627 – mitochondria, muscle
- MeSH A11.284.430.214.190.875.564.627.603 – mitochondria, heart
- MeSH A11.284.430.214.190.875.564.882 – submitochondrial particles
- MeSH A11.284.430.214.190.875.700 – plastids
- MeSH A11.284.430.214.190.875.700.140 – chloroplasts
- MeSH A11.284.430.214.190.875.700.140.800 – thylakoids
- MeSH A11.284.430.214.190.875.811 – ribosomes
- MeSH A11.284.430.214.190.875.811.740 – polyribosomes
- MeSH A11.284.430.214.190.875.811.740.300 – endoplasmic reticulum, rough
- MeSH A11.284.430.214.190.875.811.740.300.610 – nissl bodies
- MeSH A11.284.430.214.190.875.820 – sarcomeres
- MeSH A11.284.430.214.190.875.930 – vault ribonucleoprotein particles
- MeSH A11.284.430.214.200 – cytosol
- MeSH A11.284.430.429 – intracellular fluid
- MeSH A11.284.430.429.200 – cytosol

==== MeSH A11.284.835 – subcellular fractions ====
- MeSH A11.284.835.168 – cell-free system
- MeSH A11.284.835.450 – intracellular fluid
- MeSH A11.284.835.450.200 – cytosol
- MeSH A11.284.835.514 – intracellular membranes
- MeSH A11.284.835.514.349 – mitochondrial membranes
- MeSH A11.284.835.514.700 – nuclear envelope
- MeSH A11.284.835.514.700.500 – nuclear lamina
- MeSH A11.284.835.540 – microsomes
- MeSH A11.284.835.540.541 – microsomes, liver
- MeSH A11.284.835.626 – mitochondria
- MeSH A11.284.835.626.461 – mitochondria, liver
- MeSH A11.284.835.626.627 – mitochondria, muscle
- MeSH A11.284.835.626.627.603 – mitochondria, heart
- MeSH A11.284.835.626.882 – submitochondrial particles
- MeSH A11.284.835.859 – synaptosomes

=== MeSH A11.329 – connective tissue cells ===
==== MeSH A11.329.228 – fibroblasts ====
- MeSH A11.329.228.220 – cos cells
- MeSH A11.329.228.505 – l cells
- MeSH A11.329.228.900 – 3t3 cells
- MeSH A11.329.228.900.080 – balb 3t3 cells
- MeSH A11.329.228.900.550 – nih 3t3 cells
- MeSH A11.329.228.900.775 – Swiss 3t3 cells
- MeSH A11.329.228.900.775.800 – 3T3-L1 cells
- MeSH A11.329.228.950 – mesangial cells

==== MeSH A11.329.372 – macrophages ====
- MeSH A11.329.372.300 – epithelioid cells
- MeSH A11.329.372.368 – foam cells
- MeSH A11.329.372.376 – giant cells, foreign-body
- MeSH A11.329.372.380 – giant cells, langhans
- MeSH A11.329.372.385 – histiocytes
- MeSH A11.329.372.588 – kupffer cells
- MeSH A11.329.372.600 – macrophages, alveolar
- MeSH A11.329.372.630 – macrophages, peritoneal
- MeSH A11.329.372.700 – osteoclasts

==== MeSH A11.329.629 – osteoblasts ====
- MeSH A11.329.629.500 – osteocytes

=== MeSH A11.436 – epithelial cells ===
==== MeSH A11.436.265 – chromatophores ====
- MeSH A11.436.265.531 – melanophores
- MeSH A11.436.265.531.560 – melanosomes

==== MeSH A11.436.270 – dendritic cells ====
- MeSH A11.436.270.545 – langerhans cells

==== MeSH A11.436.294 – enteroendocrine cells ====
- MeSH A11.436.294.031 – enterochromaffin cells
- MeSH A11.436.294.047 – enterochromaffin-like cells
- MeSH A11.436.294.055 – gastrin-secreting cells
- MeSH A11.436.294.064 – glucagon-secreting cells
- MeSH A11.436.294.092 – insulin-secreting cells
- MeSH A11.436.294.900 – pancreatic polypeptide-secreting cells
- MeSH A11.436.294.950 – somatostatin-secreting cells

==== MeSH A11.436.340 – hela cells ====
- MeSH A11.436.340.500 – kb cells

==== MeSH A11.436.613 – melanocytes ====
- MeSH A11.436.613.560 – melanosomes

==== MeSH A11.436.690 – neuroepithelial cells ====
- MeSH A11.436.690.550 – neuroepithelial bodies

=== MeSH A11.443 – erythroid cells ===
==== MeSH A11.443.240 – erythrocytes ====
- MeSH A11.443.240.330 – erythrocytes, abnormal
- MeSH A11.443.240.330.100 – acanthocytes
- MeSH A11.443.240.330.531 – megaloblasts
- MeSH A11.443.240.330.802 – spherocytes

==== MeSH A11.443.250 – erythroid progenitor cells ====
- MeSH A11.443.250.200 – erythroblasts
- MeSH A11.443.250.200.500 – megaloblasts
- MeSH A11.443.250.480 – k562 cells
- MeSH A11.443.250.520 – megakaryocytes
- MeSH A11.443.250.760 – reticulocytes

=== MeSH A11.497 – germ cells ===
==== MeSH A11.497.497 – ovum ====
- MeSH A11.497.497.600 – oocytes
- MeSH A11.497.497.650 – oogonia
- MeSH A11.497.497.900 – zona pellucida
- MeSH A11.497.497.950 – zygote

==== MeSH A11.497.760 – spermatozoa ====
- MeSH A11.497.760.400 – sperm head
- MeSH A11.497.760.400.100 – acrosome
- MeSH A11.497.760.450 – sperm midpiece
- MeSH A11.497.760.500 – sperm tail
- MeSH A11.497.760.600 – spermatids
- MeSH A11.497.760.700 – spermatocytes
- MeSH A11.497.760.800 – spermatogonia

=== MeSH A11.620 – muscle cells ===
==== MeSH A11.620.249 – muscle fibers ====
- MeSH A11.620.249.400 – muscle fibers, fast-twitch
- MeSH A11.620.249.700 – muscle fibers, slow-twitch
- MeSH A11.620.249.850 – myofibrils

=== MeSH A11.627 – myeloid cells ===
==== MeSH A11.627.340 – granulocytes ====
- MeSH A11.627.340.120 – basophils
- MeSH A11.627.340.345 – eosinophils
- MeSH A11.627.340.360 – granulocyte precursor cells
- MeSH A11.627.340.360.500 – hl-60 cells
- MeSH A11.627.340.583 – neutrophils

==== MeSH A11.627.624 – monocytes ====
- MeSH A11.627.624.480 – macrophages
- MeSH A11.627.624.480.300 – epithelioid cells
- MeSH A11.627.624.480.368 – foam cells
- MeSH A11.627.624.480.376 – giant cells, foreign-body
- MeSH A11.627.624.480.380 – giant cells, langhans
- MeSH A11.627.624.480.385 – histiocytes
- MeSH A11.627.624.480.588 – kupffer cells
- MeSH A11.627.624.480.600 – macrophages, alveolar
- MeSH A11.627.624.480.630 – macrophages, peritoneal
- MeSH A11.627.624.480.700 – osteoclasts
- MeSH A11.627.624.500 – monocytes, activated killer
- MeSH A11.627.624.880 – u937 cells

==== MeSH A11.627.635 – myeloid progenitor cells ====
- MeSH A11.627.635.350 – granulocyte precursor cells

=== MeSH A11.635 – myoblasts ===
==== MeSH A11.635.500 – myoblasts, skeletal ====
- MeSH A11.635.500.700 – satellite cells, skeletal muscle

=== MeSH A11.650 – neuroglia ===
==== MeSH A11.650.500 – neuropil ====
- MeSH A11.650.500.550 – neuropil threads

==== MeSH A11.650.600 – oligodendroglia ====
- MeSH A11.650.600.500 – myelin sheath

==== MeSH A11.650.800 – schwann cells ====
- MeSH A11.650.800.500 – myelin sheath
- MeSH A11.650.800.500.550 – neurilemma
- MeSH A11.650.800.500.700 – ranvier's nodes

=== MeSH A11.671 – neurons ===
==== MeSH A11.671.078 – autonomic fibers, postganglionic ====
- MeSH A11.671.078.700 – parasympathetic fibers, postganglionic
- MeSH A11.671.078.800 – sympathetic fibers, postganglionic

==== MeSH A11.671.137 – axons ====
- MeSH A11.671.137.340 – growth cones
- MeSH A11.671.137.560 – mossy fibers, hippocampal
- MeSH A11.671.137.750 – presynaptic terminals

==== MeSH A11.671.240 – dendrites ====
- MeSH A11.671.240.169 – dendritic spines
- MeSH A11.671.240.340 – growth cones

==== MeSH A11.671.358 – interneurons ====
- MeSH A11.671.358.050 – amacrine cells
- MeSH A11.671.358.700 – retinal bipolar cells

==== MeSH A11.671.514 – nerve fibers, myelinated ====
- MeSH A11.671.514.553 – myelin sheath
- MeSH A11.671.514.553.550 – neurilemma
- MeSH A11.671.514.553.640 – ranvier's nodes

==== MeSH A11.671.573 – neurofibrils ====
- MeSH A11.671.573.520 – neurofibrillary tangles

==== MeSH A11.671.650 – neurons, afferent ====
- MeSH A11.671.650.250 – hair cells
- MeSH A11.671.650.250.250 – hair cells, inner
- MeSH A11.671.650.250.315 – hair cells, outer
- MeSH A11.671.650.250.380 – hair cells, vestibular
- MeSH A11.671.650.540 – olfactory receptor neurons
- MeSH A11.671.650.650 – photoreceptors
- MeSH A11.671.650.650.650 – photoreceptors, invertebrate
- MeSH A11.671.650.650.670 – photoreceptors, vertebrate
- MeSH A11.671.650.650.670.100 – cones
- MeSH A11.671.650.650.670.625 – retinal ganglion cells
- MeSH A11.671.650.650.670.650 – rod
- MeSH A11.671.650.650.670.650.650 – rod outer segments
- MeSH A11.671.650.675 – posterior horn cells
- MeSH A11.671.650.675.800 – substantia gelatinosa
- MeSH A11.671.650.700 – retinal ganglion cells
- MeSH A11.671.650.720 – retinal horizontal cells

==== MeSH A11.671.655 – neurons, efferent ====
- MeSH A11.671.655.500 – motor neurons
- MeSH A11.671.655.500.050 – anterior horn cells
- MeSH A11.671.655.500.525 – motor neurons, gamma

==== MeSH A11.671.685 – neuropil ====
- MeSH A11.671.685.550 – neuropil threads

=== MeSH A11.733 – phagocytes ===
==== MeSH A11.733.397 – macrophages ====
- MeSH A11.733.397.300 – epithelioid cells
- MeSH A11.733.397.368 – foam cells
- MeSH A11.733.397.376 – giant cells, foreign-body
- MeSH A11.733.397.380 – giant cells, langhans
- MeSH A11.733.397.385 – histiocytes
- MeSH A11.733.397.588 – kupffer cells
- MeSH A11.733.397.600 – macrophages, alveolar
- MeSH A11.733.397.630 – macrophages, peritoneal

==== MeSH A11.733.547 – monocytes ====
- MeSH A11.733.547.500 – monocytes, activated killer

=== MeSH A11.872 – stem cells ===
==== MeSH A11.872.378 – hematopoietic stem cells ====
- MeSH A11.872.378.590 – myeloid progenitor cells
- MeSH A11.872.378.590.270 – erythroid progenitor cells

==== MeSH A11.872.645 – myoblasts ====
- MeSH A11.872.645.470 – myoblasts, cardiac
- MeSH A11.872.645.500 – myoblasts, skeletal
- MeSH A11.872.645.500.700 – satellite cells, skeletal muscle
- MeSH A11.872.645.510 – myoblasts, smooth muscle

=== MeSH A11.936 – trophoblasts ===
The list continues at List of MeSH codes (A12).
