= List of MeSH codes (A09) =

The following is a partial list of the "A" codes for Medical Subject Headings (MeSH), as defined by the United States National Library of Medicine (NLM).

This list continues the information at List of MeSH codes (A08). Codes following these are found at List of MeSH codes (A10). For other MeSH codes, see List of MeSH codes.

The source for this content is the set of 2006 MeSH Trees from the NLM.

== MeSH A09 – sense organs ==
=== MeSH A09.246 – ear ===
==== MeSH A09.246.272 – ear, external ====
- MeSH A09.246.272.396 – ear canal
- MeSH A09.246.272.405 – ear cartilages
- MeSH A09.246.272.702 – tympanic membrane

==== MeSH A09.246.397 – ear, middle ====
- MeSH A09.246.397.247 – ear ossicles
- MeSH A09.246.397.247.362 – incus
- MeSH A09.246.397.247.524 – malleus
- MeSH A09.246.397.247.806 – stapes
- MeSH A09.246.397.369 – eustachian tube
- MeSH A09.246.397.400 – glomus tympanicum
- MeSH A09.246.397.727 – stapedius
- MeSH A09.246.397.749 – tensor tympani

==== MeSH A09.246.631 – ear, inner ====
- MeSH A09.246.631.246 – cochlea
- MeSH A09.246.631.246.125 – basilar membrane
- MeSH A09.246.631.246.280 – cochlear aqueduct
- MeSH A09.246.631.246.292 – cochlear duct
- MeSH A09.246.631.246.292.876 – stria vascularis
- MeSH A09.246.631.246.292.906 – tectorial membrane
- MeSH A09.246.631.246.577 – organ of corti
- MeSH A09.246.631.246.577.325 – hair cells
- MeSH A09.246.631.246.577.325.315 – hair cells, inner
- MeSH A09.246.631.246.577.325.380 – hair cells, outer
- MeSH A09.246.631.246.577.543 – labyrinth supporting cells
- MeSH A09.246.631.246.814 – round window
- MeSH A09.246.631.246.848 – scala tympani
- MeSH A09.246.631.246.900 – spiral ganglion
- MeSH A09.246.631.246.930 – spiral lamina
- MeSH A09.246.631.663 – semicircular canals
- MeSH A09.246.631.663.350 – hair cells, vestibular
- MeSH A09.246.631.909 – vestibule of the ear
- MeSH A09.246.631.909.551 – oval window
- MeSH A09.246.631.909.625 – saccule and utricle
- MeSH A09.246.631.909.625.125 – acoustic maculae
- MeSH A09.246.631.909.625.125.340 – hair cells, vestibular
- MeSH A09.246.631.909.625.125.680 – otolithic membrane
- MeSH A09.246.631.909.957 – vestibular aqueduct
- MeSH A09.246.631.909.957.360 – endolymphatic duct
- MeSH A09.246.631.909.957.360.701 – endolymphatic sac

=== MeSH A09.371 – eye ===
==== MeSH A09.371.060 – anterior eye segment ====
- MeSH A09.371.060.067 – anterior chamber
- MeSH A09.371.060.067.070 – aqueous humor
- MeSH A09.371.060.067.318 – endothelium, corneal
- MeSH A09.371.060.217 – cornea
- MeSH A09.371.060.217.113 – bowman membrane
- MeSH A09.371.060.217.228 – corneal stroma
- MeSH A09.371.060.217.271 – descemet membrane
- MeSH A09.371.060.217.318 – endothelium, corneal
- MeSH A09.371.060.217.325 – epithelium, corneal
- MeSH A09.371.060.217.659 – limbus corneae
- MeSH A09.371.060.932 – trabecular meshwork

==== MeSH A09.371.337 – eyelids ====
- MeSH A09.371.337.338 – eyelashes
- MeSH A09.371.337.614 – meibomian glands

==== MeSH A09.371.463 – lacrimal apparatus ====
- MeSH A09.371.463.640 – nasolacrimal duct

==== MeSH A09.371.509 – lens, crystalline ====
- MeSH A09.371.509.155 – lens capsule, crystalline
- MeSH A09.371.509.225 – lens cortex, crystalline
- MeSH A09.371.509.670 – lens nucleus, crystalline

==== MeSH A09.371.729 – retina ====
- MeSH A09.371.729.050 – amacrine cells
- MeSH A09.371.729.055 – blood-retinal barrier
- MeSH A09.371.729.313 – fundus oculi
- MeSH A09.371.729.522 – macula lutea
- MeSH A09.371.729.522.436 – fovea centralis
- MeSH A09.371.729.690 – optic disk
- MeSH A09.371.729.727 – photoreceptors
- MeSH A09.371.729.727.660 – photoreceptors, invertebrate
- MeSH A09.371.729.727.670 – photoreceptors, vertebrate
- MeSH A09.371.729.727.670.100 – rods
- MeSH A09.371.729.727.670.650 – cones
- MeSH A09.371.729.727.670.650.650 – rod outer segments
- MeSH A09.371.729.760 – retinal bipolar cells
- MeSH A09.371.729.765 – retinal ganglion cells
- MeSH A09.371.729.775 – retinal horizontal cells

==== MeSH A09.371.894 – uvea ====
- MeSH A09.371.894.030 – blood-aqueous barrier
- MeSH A09.371.894.223 – choroid
- MeSH A09.371.894.223.250 – bruch membrane
- MeSH A09.371.894.280 – ciliary body
- MeSH A09.371.894.513 – iris
- MeSH A09.371.894.513.780 – pupil

=== MeSH A09.531 – nose ===
==== MeSH A09.531.623 – olfactory mucosa ====
- MeSH A09.531.623.580 – olfactory receptor neurons

=== MeSH A09.846 – taste buds ===
The list continues at List of MeSH codes (A10).
