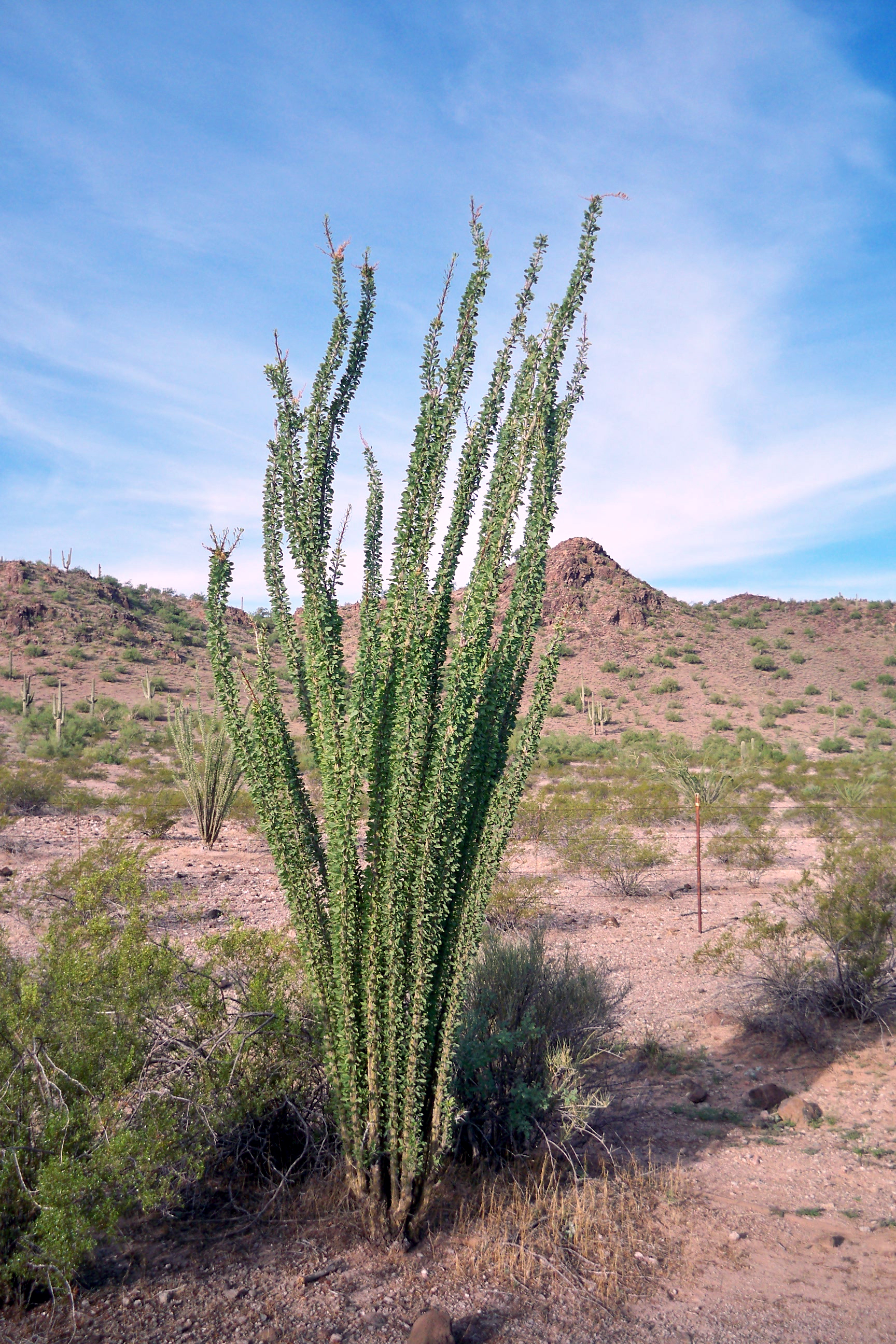
- Ocotillo near Gila Bend, Arizona

Conservation status
- Secure (NatureServe)

Scientific classification
- Kingdom: Plantae
- Clade: Tracheophytes
- Clade: Angiosperms
- Clade: Eudicots
- Clade: Asterids
- Order: Ericales
- Family: Fouquieriaceae
- Genus: Fouquieria
- Species: F. splendens

Binomial name
- Fouquieria splendens Engelm.

Synonyms
- Fouquieria spinosa Torr.

= Fouquieria splendens =

Ocotillo

Species of flowering plant

Fouquieria splendens, commonly known as ocotillo, (Note: /ɒkəˈtiːjoʊ/, Latin American Spanish: [okoˈtiʝo]) is a plant indigenous to the Mojave, Sonoran, Chihuahuan and Colorado deserts in the Southwestern United States (southern California, southern Nevada, Arizona, New Mexico, Texas), and northern Mexico (as far south as Hidalgo and Guerrero).

Ocotillos look desiccated on the outside, but they are semi-succulent; it is more closely related to the tea plant and blueberries than to cactuses. It regenerates leaves after rainfall. They can be planted as garden ornamentals.

== Names ==
The name ocotillo comes from the Nahuatl word ocotl meaning "torch".

It is also known as buggywhip, coachwhip, candlewood, slimwood, desert coral, Jacob's staff, Jacob cactus, and vine cactus.

== Botany ==
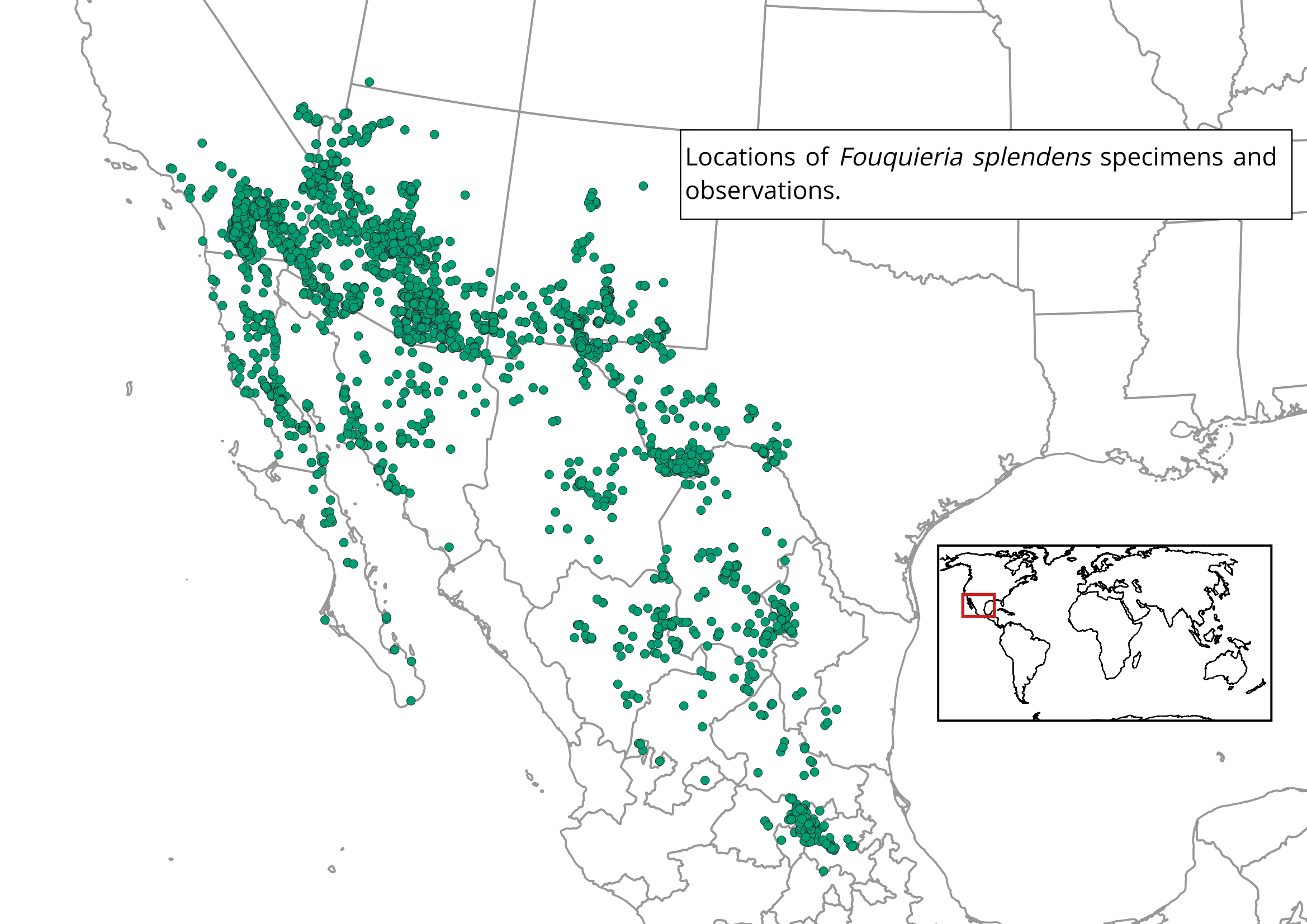
Distribution of Fouquieria splendens in Mexico and the United States.

It grows in dry, generally rocky desert soils.

An ocotillo plant reaches maturity at 60–100 years, it grows to a maximum height of 10–15 feet (3.0–4.6 m). It consists of a clump of 40–75 straight and slender greenish branches covered with thorns; each stem may reach a diameter of 6 cm (2.4 in) at the base. The branches have a rough bark, they produce small, ovate leaves 2–4 cm (0.79–1.57 in) long directly from their sides. With rainfall, the plant quickly becomes lush with which may remain for weeks or even months. Specimens in cultivation may not exhibit any secondary branches. The leaf stalks harden into blunt spines, and new leaves sprout from the base of the spine.

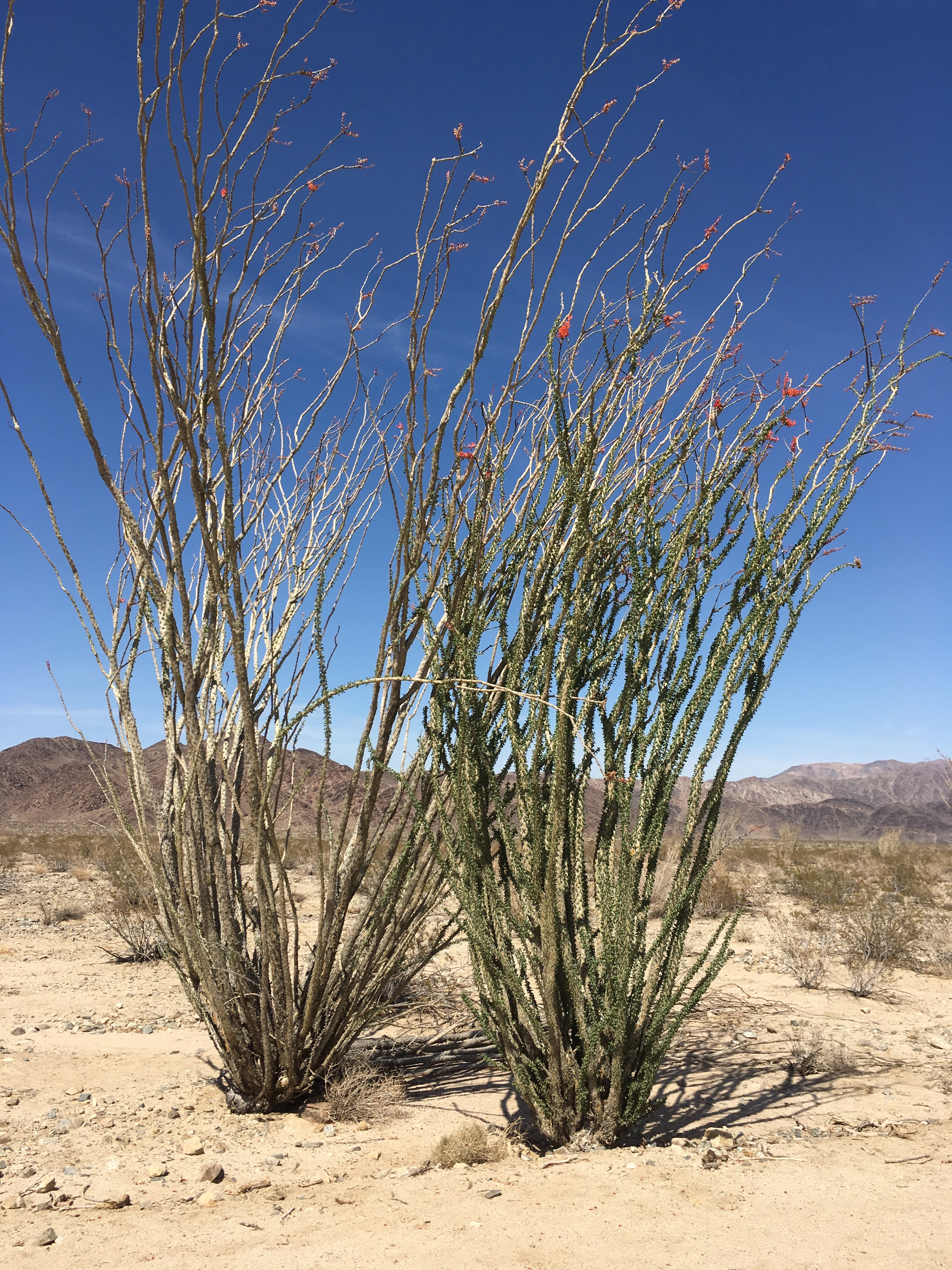
Ocotillo plant in Joshua Tree National Park

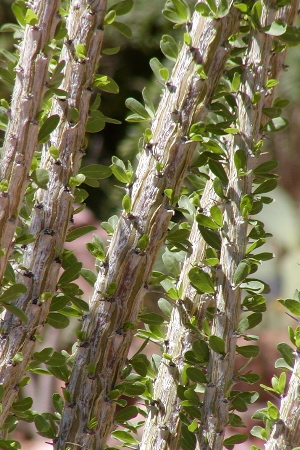
Closeup of leaves

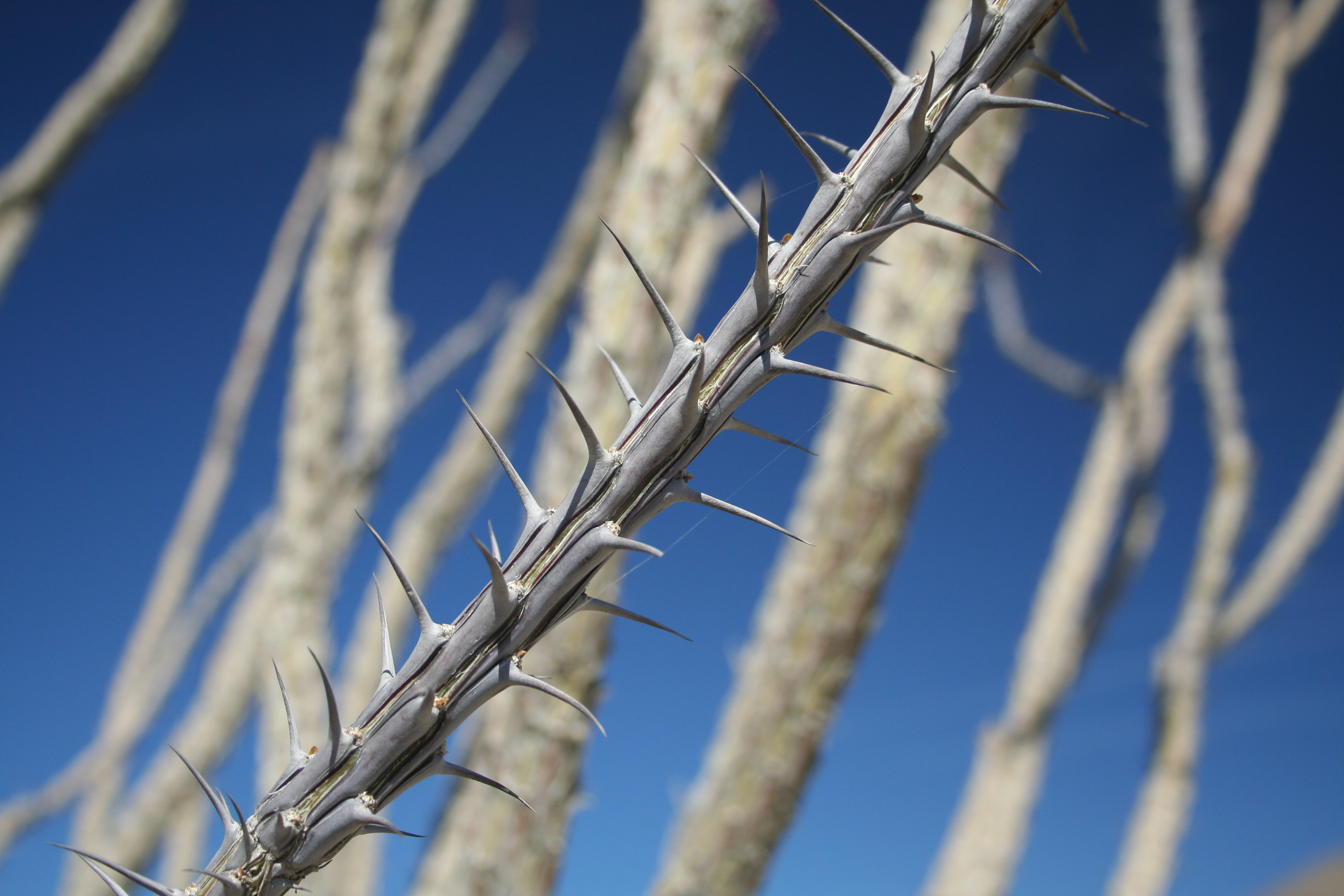
Closeup of thorns in Anza-Borrego Desert State Park

Bright crimson flowers appear especially on mature plants after rainfall in spring, summer, and occasionally fall; they are clustered indeterminately at the tips of each stem. Individual flowers are mildly zygomorphic and are pollinated by hummingbirds and native carpenter bees. The flowers last for a period of between one and a half to 2 months.

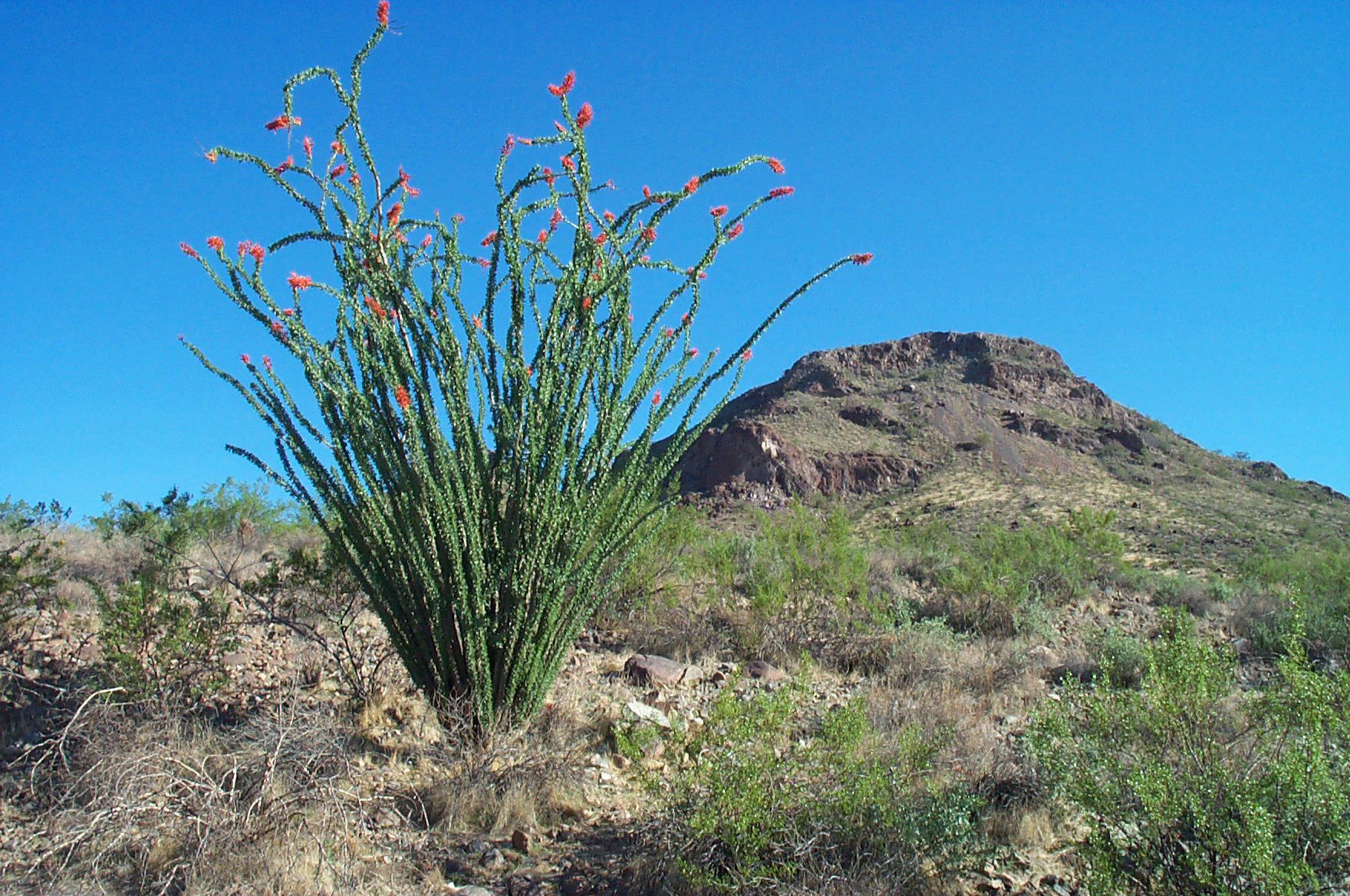
Ocotillo in full bloom near Lookout Mountain, Phoenix, Arizona

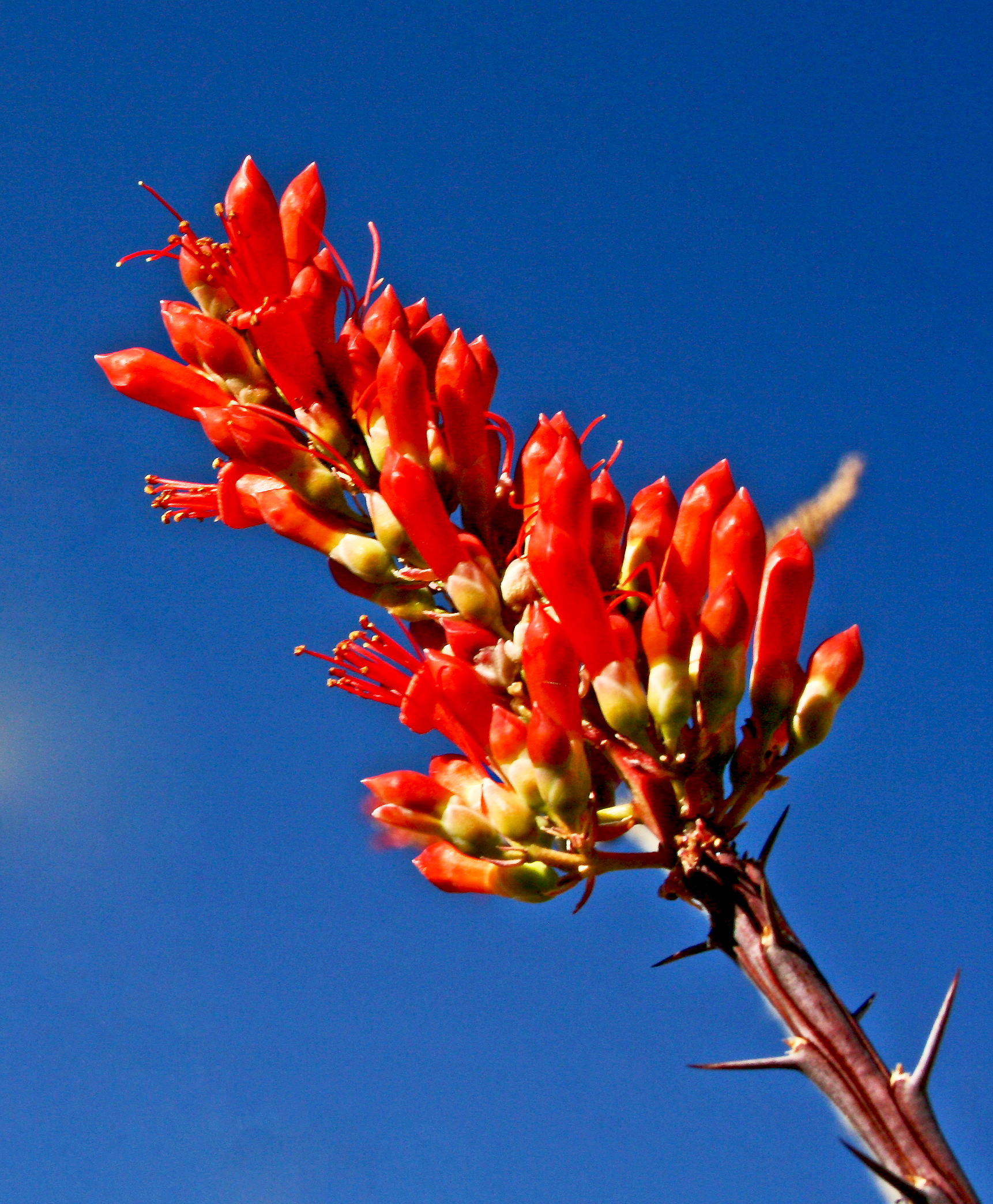
An ocotillo flower with visible needles

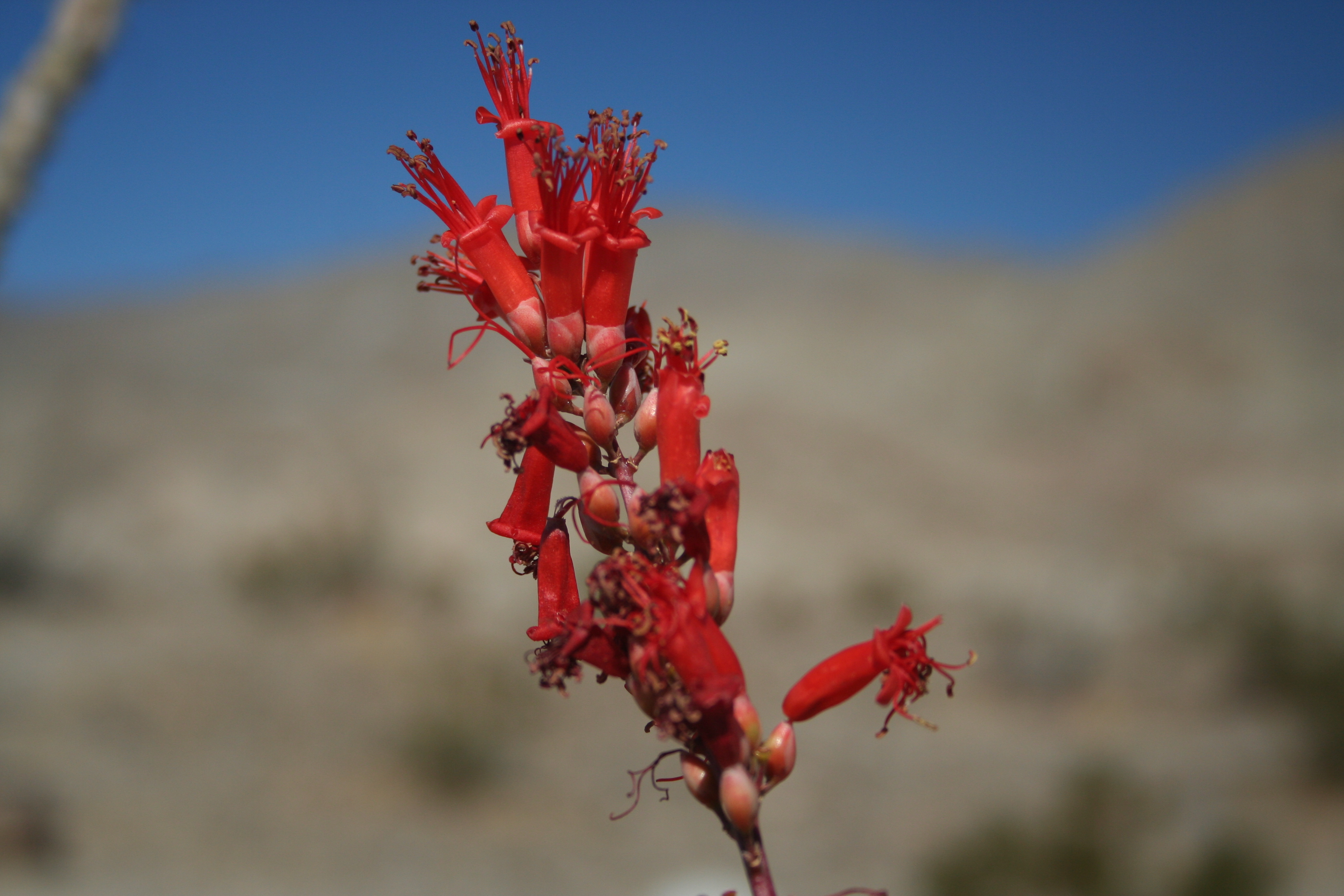
Closeup of ocotillo flowers in Anza-Borrego Desert State Park

== Cultivation ==
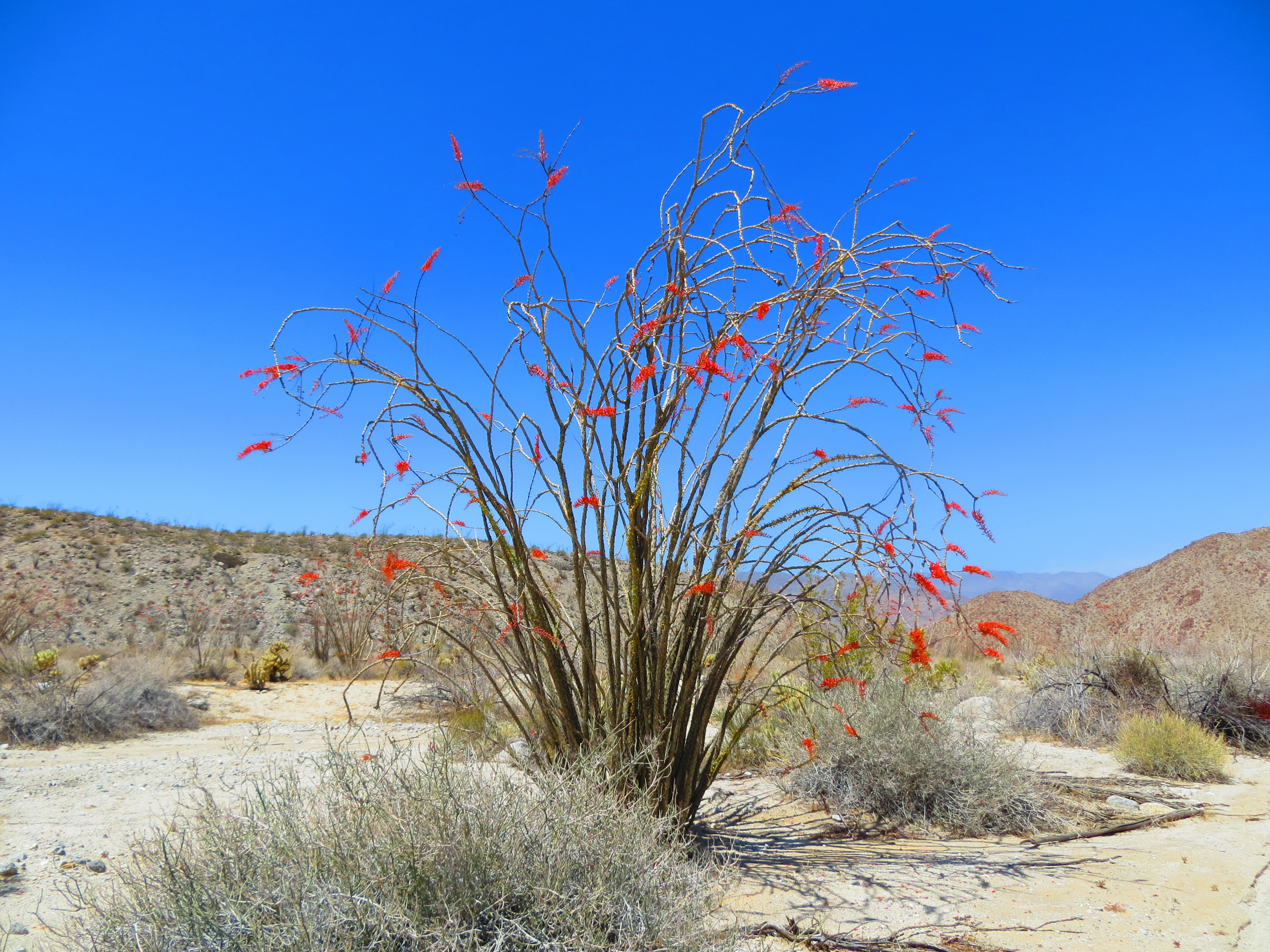
An ocotillo in spring bloom on Pinyon Wash Road in Anza-Borrego Desert State Park, California

Ocotillo can be planted year-round with care. Ideal plants have been grown in pots from stem cuttings and from seed. Transplanting large bare-root plants has marginal success. They should be planted to the original growing depth and, as with cacti, in their original directional orientation: the original south side of the plant, which has become more heat- and sunlight-resistant, should again face the brighter, hotter southern direction. If their direction is not marked, success is again limited.

== Uses ==
- Individual ocotillo stems are sometimes used as poles as a fencing material in their native region, and often take root to form a living fence.
- Due to their light weight and interesting pattern, ocotillo branches have been used for canes or walking sticks.
- Fresh flowers are sometimes used in salads and have a tangy flavor.
- Flowers are collected, dried, and used for tisanes.
- According to Medicinal Plants of the Desert and Canyon West (a book published in 1989 by Museum of New Mexico Press), a fresh bark tincture can be made by chopping or snipping freshly removed bark into 1/2-inch pieces. It is said to be useful for those symptoms that arise due to fluid congestion and to be absorbed from the intestines into the mesenteric lymph system by way of the lacteals of the small intestinal lining. This is believed to stimulate better visceral lymph drainage into the thoracic duct and improve dietary fat absorption into the lymph system.
- Bathing in water that contains crushed flowers or roots has been used to relieve fatigue.
- Native Americans place the flowers and roots of ocotillo over fresh wounds to slow bleeding.
- Ocotillo is also used to alleviate coughing, achy limbs, varicose veins, urinary tract infections, cervical varicosities, and benign prostate growths.

== Subspecies ==
The three subspecies are:

- F. s. splendens Engelm.
- F. s. breviflora Henrickson
- F. s. campanulata (Nash) Henrickson

== Gallery ==
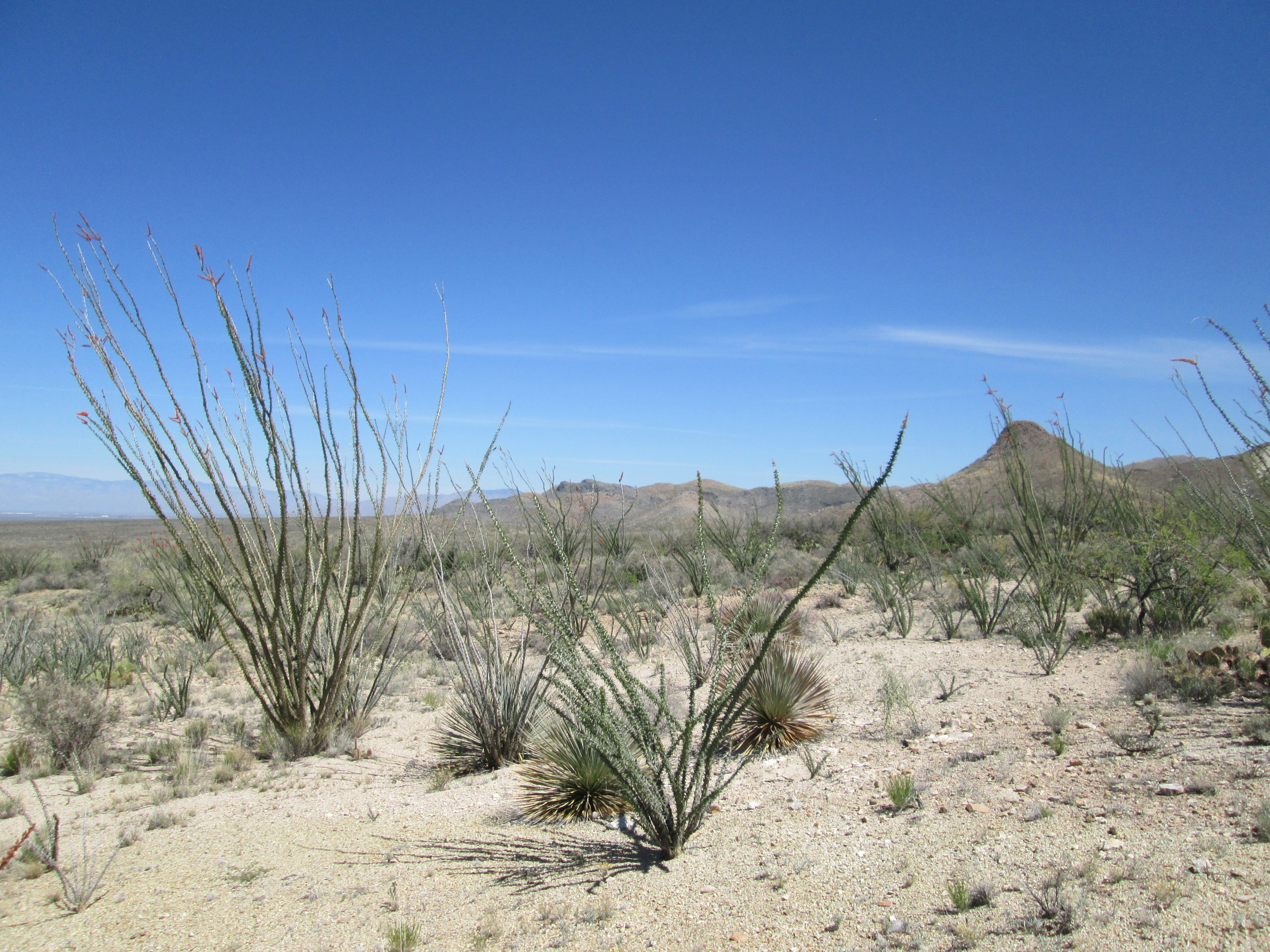
Ocotillo forest in the Santa Rita Mountains of Arizona

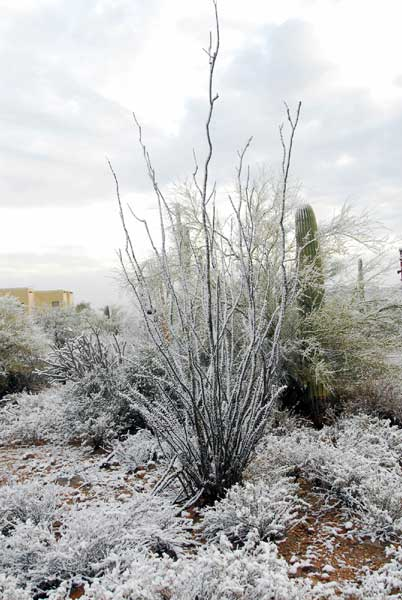
Ocotillo covered with rare snow in Tucson, Arizona

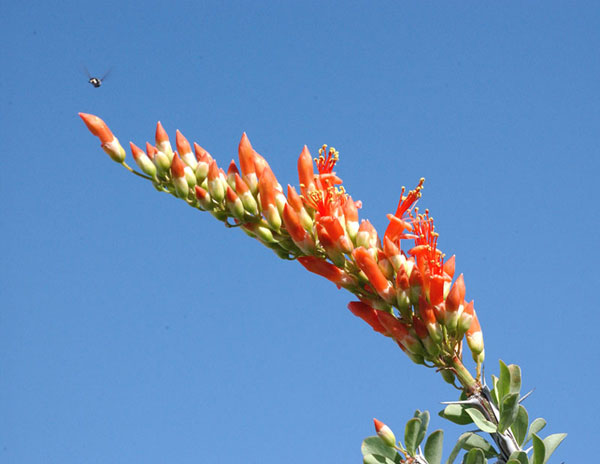
Ocotillo flower with a bee above — Tucson

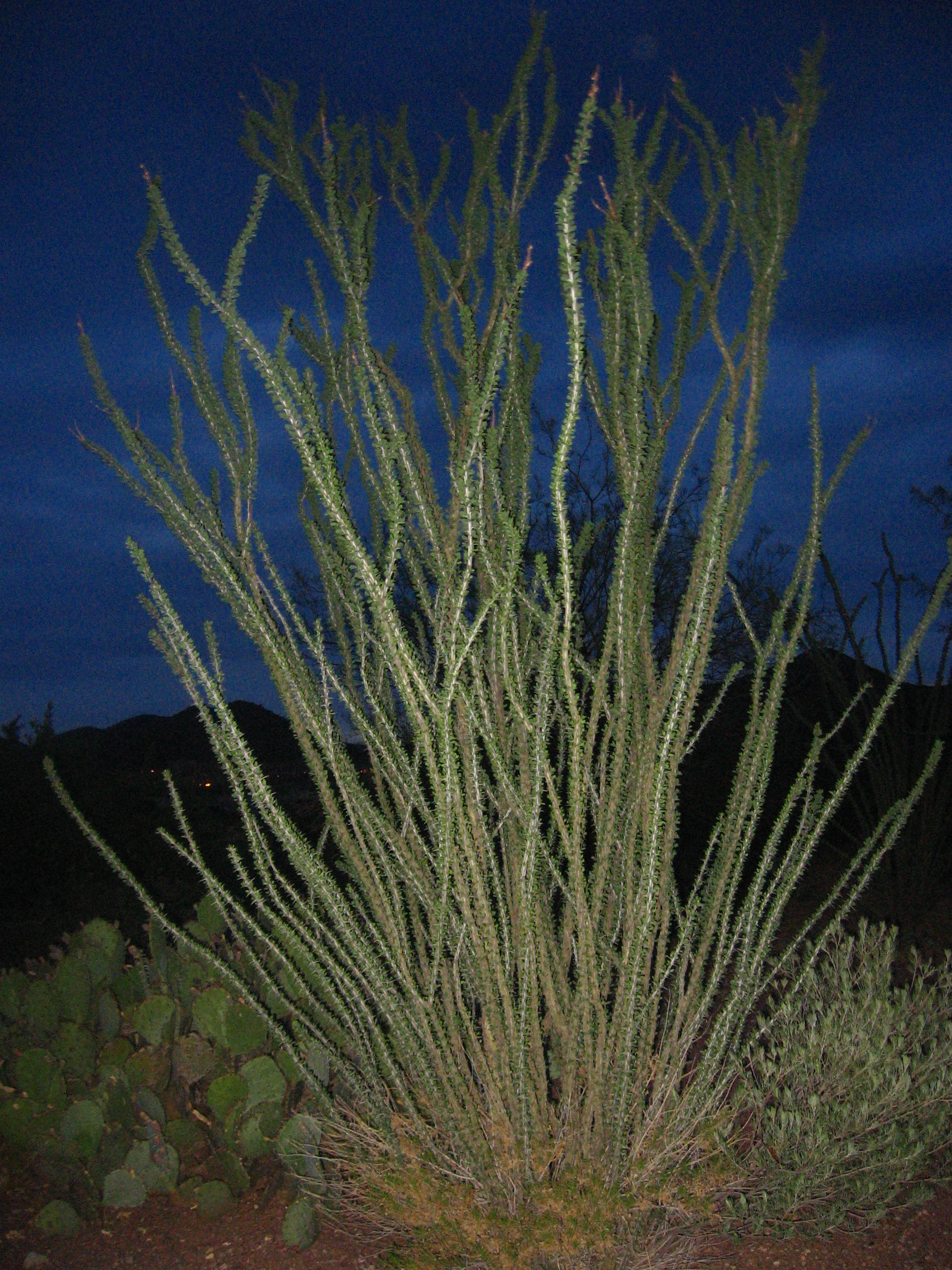
Ocotillo with leaves outside Tucson Mountains after a rain

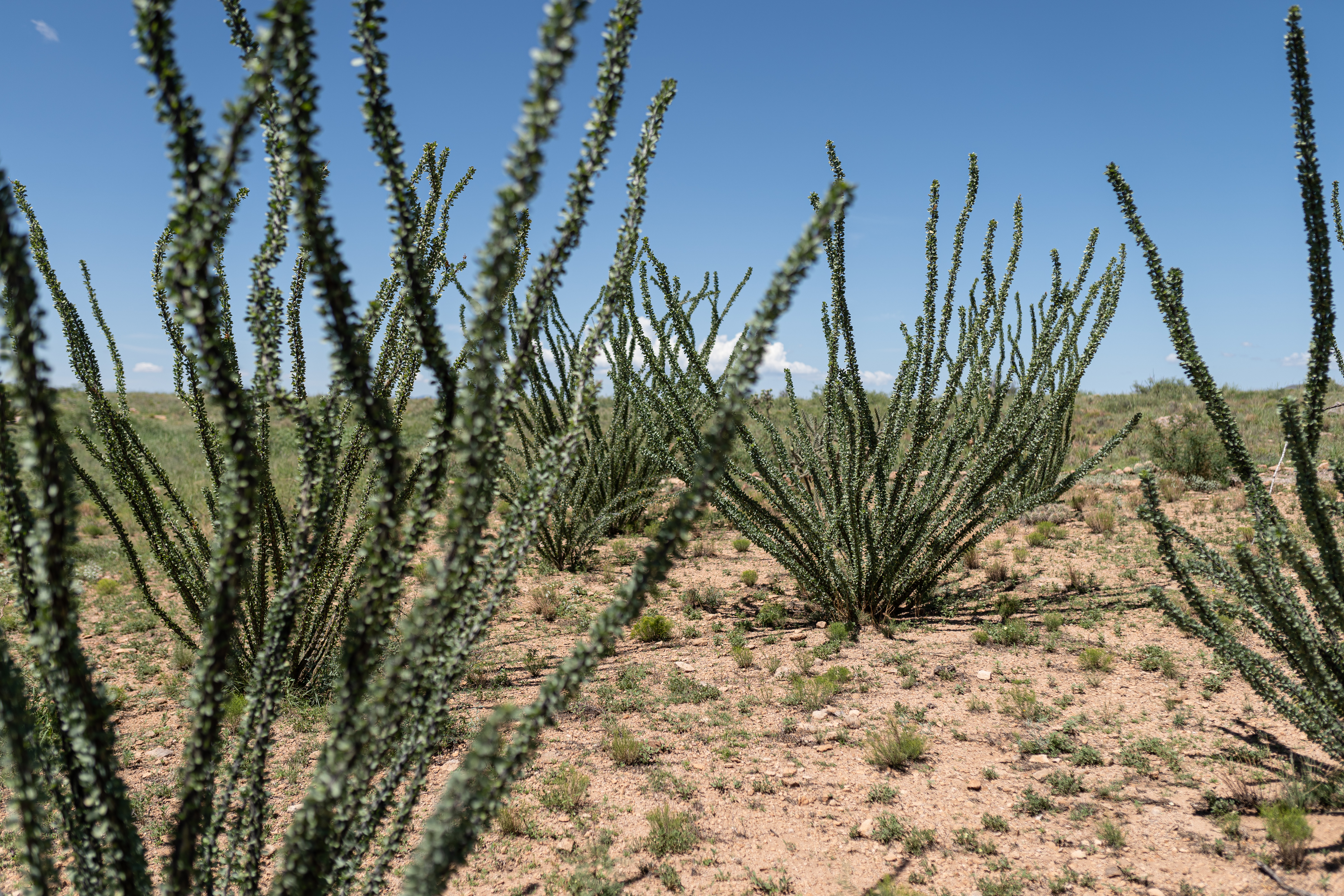
Ocotillo in the City of Rocks State Park's desert botanical garden
