= List of MeSH codes (A10) =

The following is a partial list of the "A" codes for Medical Subject Headings (MeSH), as defined by the United States National Library of Medicine (NLM).

This list continues the information at List of MeSH codes (A09). Codes following these are found at List of MeSH codes (A11). For other MeSH codes, see List of MeSH codes.

The source for this content is the set of 2006 MeSH Trees from the NLM.

== MeSH A10 – tissues ==
=== MeSH A10.165 – connective tissue ===
- MeSH A10.165.114 – adipose tissue
- MeSH A10.165.114.160 – abdominal fat
- MeSH A10.165.114.160.500 – intra-abdominal fat
- MeSH A10.165.114.160.750 – subcutaneous fat, abdominal
- MeSH A10.165.114.322 – brown fat
- MeSH A10.165.114.661 – subcutaneous fat
- MeSH A10.165.114.661.500 – subcutaneous fat, abdominal
- MeSH A10.165.265 – bone and bones
- MeSH A10.165.265.166 – bone matrix
- MeSH A10.165.265.200 – bony callus
- MeSH A10.165.265.507 – haversian system
- MeSH A10.165.265.746 – periosteum
- MeSH A10.165.382 – cartilage
- MeSH A10.165.382.300 – elastic cartilage
- MeSH A10.165.382.350 – fibrocartilage
- MeSH A10.165.382.350.800 – triangular fibrocartilage
- MeSH A10.165.382.400 – hyaline cartilage
- MeSH A10.165.400 – elastic tissue
- MeSH A10.165.450 – granulation tissue
- MeSH A10.165.450.300 – cicatrix
- MeSH A10.165.887 – subcutaneous tissue

=== MeSH A10.272 – epithelium ===
- MeSH A10.272.220 – basement membrane
- MeSH A10.272.220.250 – bruch membrane
- MeSH A10.272.491 – endothelium
- MeSH A10.272.491.318 – endothelium, corneal
- MeSH A10.272.491.332 – endothelium, lymphatic
- MeSH A10.272.491.355 – endothelium, vascular
- MeSH A10.272.491.355.600 – pericytes
- MeSH A10.272.491.355.800 – tunica intima
- MeSH A10.272.497 – epidermis
- MeSH A10.272.497.500 – hair follicle
- MeSH A10.272.510 – epithelium, corneal
- MeSH A10.272.640 – pigment epithelium of eye
- MeSH A10.272.700 – seminiferous epithelium
- MeSH A10.272.850 – urothelium

=== MeSH A10.336 – exocrine glands ===
- MeSH A10.336.095 – Bartholin's glands
- MeSH A10.336.197 – bulbourethral glands
- MeSH A10.336.422 – lacrimal apparatus
- MeSH A10.336.482 – mammary glands, animal
- MeSH A10.336.532 – mammary glands, human
- MeSH A10.336.645 – pancreas, exocrine
- MeSH A10.336.707 – prostate
- MeSH A10.336.779 – salivary glands
- MeSH A10.336.779.464 – parotid gland
- MeSH A10.336.779.640 – salivary ducts
- MeSH A10.336.779.650 – salivary glands, minor
- MeSH A10.336.779.687 – sublingual gland
- MeSH A10.336.779.812 – submandibular gland
- MeSH A10.336.827 – sebaceous glands
- MeSH A10.336.827.600 – meibomian glands
- MeSH A10.336.899 – sweat glands
- MeSH A10.336.899.206 – apocrine glands
- MeSH A10.336.899.480 – eccrine glands

=== MeSH A10.549 – lymphoid tissue ===
- MeSH A10.549.100 – adenoids
- MeSH A10.549.175 – bursa of fabricius
- MeSH A10.549.250 – germinal center
- MeSH A10.549.250.200 – dendritic cells, follicular
- MeSH A10.549.400 – lymph nodes
- MeSH A10.549.400.500 – germinal center
- MeSH A10.549.400.500.200 – dendritic cells, follicular
- MeSH A10.549.600 – peyer's patches
- MeSH A10.549.700 – spleen
- MeSH A10.549.750 – thymus gland
- MeSH A10.549.800 – tonsil

=== MeSH A10.615 – membranes ===
- MeSH A10.615.179 – basement membrane
- MeSH A10.615.179.124 – basilar membrane
- MeSH A10.615.179.250 – bruch membrane
- MeSH A10.615.179.437 – descemet membrane
- MeSH A10.615.179.625 – glomerular basement membrane
- MeSH A10.615.284 – extraembryonic membranes
- MeSH A10.615.284.147 – allantois
- MeSH A10.615.284.277 – amnion
- MeSH A10.615.284.375 – chorioallantoic membrane
- MeSH A10.615.284.473 – chorion
- MeSH A10.615.284.473.200 – chorionic villi
- MeSH A10.615.284.981 – yolk sac
- MeSH A10.615.550 – mucous membrane
- MeSH A10.615.550.291 – gastric mucosa
- MeSH A10.615.550.291.150 – chief cells, gastric
- MeSH A10.615.550.291.162 – enterochromaffin cells
- MeSH A10.615.550.291.300 – gastrin-secreting cells
- MeSH A10.615.550.291.650 – parietal cells, gastric
- MeSH A10.615.550.291.825 – somatostatin-secreting cells
- MeSH A10.615.550.444 – intestinal mucosa
- MeSH A10.615.550.444.290 – enterocytes
- MeSH A10.615.550.444.321 – goblet cells
- MeSH A10.615.550.444.700 – paneth cells
- MeSH A10.615.550.599 – mouth mucosa
- MeSH A10.615.550.760 – respiratory mucosa
- MeSH A10.615.550.760.520 – laryngeal mucosa
- MeSH A10.615.550.760.520.320 – goblet cells
- MeSH A10.615.550.760.600 – nasal mucosa
- MeSH A10.615.550.760.600.320 – goblet cells
- MeSH A10.615.550.760.600.640 – olfactory mucosa
- MeSH A10.615.550.760.600.640.640 – olfactory receptor neurons
- MeSH A10.615.789 – serous membrane
- MeSH A10.615.789.470 – pericardium
- MeSH A10.615.789.596 – peritoneum
- MeSH A10.615.789.736 – pleura

=== MeSH A10.690 – Muscles ===
- MeSH A10.690.350 – muscle, skeletal
- MeSH A10.690.350.800 – sarcoplasmic reticulum
- MeSH A10.690.467 – muscle, smooth
- MeSH A10.690.467.491 – muscle, smooth, vascular
- MeSH A10.690.467.491.800 – tunica media
- MeSH A10.690.467.500 – myometrium
- MeSH A10.690.637 – myocardium

=== MeSH A10.755 – nerve tissue ===
- MeSH A10.755.260 – ependyma
- MeSH A10.755.503 – myelin sheath
- MeSH A10.755.503.550 – neurilemma
- MeSH A10.755.503.700 – ranvier's nodes
- MeSH A10.755.612 – neurilemma

=== MeSH A10.850 – surgically created structures ===
- MeSH A10.850.200 – colonic pouches
- MeSH A10.850.700 – skeletal muscle ventricle
- MeSH A10.850.705 – stomas
- MeSH A10.850.710 – surgical flaps
- MeSH A10.850.750 – urinary reservoirs, continent

The list continues at List of MeSH codes (A11).
