= HT-29 =

Human colon cancer cell line

HT-29 is a human colon cancer cell line used extensively in biological and cancer research.

== Characteristics ==
The HT-29 cell line was established in 1964 from the tumor of a 44-year-old Caucasian female with colorectal adenocarcinoma by Dr. Jorgen Fogh at the Memorial Sloan Kettering Cancer Center. HT-29 cells grow in a tight monolayer and share similar features with small intestinal enterocytes. Under specific conditions, such as glucose deprivation or exposure to differentiation-inducing agents like sodium butyrate, these cells develop epithelial cell morphology, characterized by microvilli and well-defined tight junctions.

=== Genetic characteristics and mutations ===
HT-29 cells carry several genetic alterations common in colorectal carcinomas, most notably mutations in the tumor suppressor genes TP53 and APC, and in the oncogene BRAF. Specifically, HT-29 cells overproduce the p53 tumor antigen, but have a mutation in the p53 gene at position 273, resulting in a histidine replacing an arginine. This mutation is associated with altered tumor suppressor functions, increased cellular proliferation, and resistance to apoptosis.

HT-29 cells also exhibit deregulated expression of the c-myc oncogene. Although deregulated, c-myc expression is closely linked with their responsiveness to growth factors and nutrient availability, suggesting a connection between oncogenic signaling pathways and their proliferative capacity.

The BRAF V600E mutation in these cells constantly activates the MAP kinase signaling pathway. This further contributes to cellular proliferation, survival, and resistance to various therapeutic agents. Overall, these characteristics make HT-29 cells a valuable model for studying colorectal cancer pathogenesis and treatment strategies.

== Culturing ==
=== Growth requirements ===
HT-29 cells are relatively easy to culture and maintain, which is why they are widely used as an in vitro colorectal cancer model. They grow as adherent monolayers with an epithelial-like morphology and require specific conditions for optimal growth, cell viability, and reproducibility of experimental outcomes. Though HT-29 cells can proliferate in cell culture lacking growth factors with a doubling time of around 4 days, the doubling time can be reduced to one day with added fetal bovine serum. The cells have high glucose consumption, and in standard medium containing 25 mM glucose and 10% serum, remain undifferentiated.

=== Media and environment ===
HT-29 cells are typically cultured in DMEM, a medium supplemented with 10% fetal bovine serum and antibiotics such as penicillin-streptomycin to prevent contamination. Standard DMEM with a glucose concentration of around 4.5 g/L supports the cells' high metabolic activity. Typically, cells are maintained at 37 °C in a humidified incubator with 5% CO_{2}, at a pH of about 7.4. In these conditions, HT-29 cells have a doubling time of approximately 20–30 hours.

=== Passaging ===
HT-29 cells are generally passaged every 2–3 days at about 70–80% confluency to maintain optimal growth. Passaging involved washing cells with phosphate-buffered saline (PBS), briefly detaching them using 0.25% trypsin solution. The trypsin is neutralized with serum-containing medium, and the cells are re-plated at suitable split ratios, typically between 1:3 and 1:6. If cells are treated with too much trypsin, the prolonged exposure may negatively impact cell viability.

=== Differentiation ===
HT-29 cells do not spontaneously differentiate under standard culture conditions. However, their differentiation into enterocyte-like cells can be induced through specific culture modifications or chemical treatments, allowing them to better replicate intestinal epithelial physiology. Common approaches to induce HT-29 differentiation include:

- Glucose deprivation: Culturing in glucose-limited medium (~1 g/L glucose) prompts HT-29 cells to differentiate into polarized enterocyte-like cells. Under these conditions, cells exhibit tighter junctions, an apical brush border with microvilli, and express typical intestinal enzymes.
- Sodium Butyrate Treatment: Treatment with sodium butyrate (2-5 mM) stimulates differentiation that causes increased expression of intestinal brush-border enzymes, polarization, and microvilli formation. This model mimics the differentiated features of mature colonic epithelial cells.
- Methotrexate (MTX) Selection: Treatment with methotrexate selects a mucus-secreting subpopulation known as HT29-MTX. These cells differentiate into columnar, mucus-producing epithelial cells. This subpopulation can be a valuable model for studying intestinal barrier functions, mucosal biology, and interactions with microbiota.

These differentiation methods allow researchers to adapt HT-29 cells to study gastrointestinal physiology, pharmaceutical research, and microbiomes.

=== Cryopreservation ===
Proper cryopreservation allows for the long-term storage of HT-29 cells, ensuring their availability and genetic stability for ongoing research. It is important to optimize cryopreservation to maximize cell viability upon thawing. HT-29 cells are cryopreserved using a freezing medium consisting of 90% fetal bovine serum and 10% dimethyl sulfoxide (DMSO). DMSO is a cryoprotectant to minimize ice crystal formation and cellular damage during freezing. Cells should be slowly frozen at a controlled rate (~1 °C per minute), typically using a controlled-rate freezing apparatus or an isopropanol-based container. One frozen, cells are stored in liquid nitrogen at -196 °C.

== Applications ==
=== In vitro research ===
In preclinical research, HT-29 cells are valued for their ability to mimic colon tissue in vitro through induced differentiation. HT-29 cells terminally differentiate into enterocytes with the replacement of glucose by galactose in cell culture. When treated with butyrate or acids, the differentiation pathways can be closely studied along with their dependence on surrounding conditions. Studies of HT-29 cells have also demonstrated induced differentiation in response to forskolin, Colchicine, nocodazole, and taxol, with galactose-mediated differentiation also strengthening adherens junctions.

=== Xenograft models ===
HT-29 cells can also be tested in vivo via xenografts in immunodeficient rodents. These models are useful for investigating tumor growth, epithelial function, and pharmacokinetics in a controlled and biologically relevant environment.

=== Cancer research ===
HT-29 cells serve as a fundamental research model in colorectal cancer biology due to their close representation of the genetic and molecular characteristics typical of colorectal adenocarcinomas. The critical mutations carried by these cells, such as the TP53 mutation, APC mutation, and unregulated c-myc expression contribute significantly to colorectal cancer development and progression.

Due to their ability to form tumors when xenografted into rodents, HT-29 cells facilitate in vivo studies of tumor growth dynamics, tumor angiogenesis, metastatic behavior, and tumor-host interactions. Recent studies have utilized HT-29 cells in xenograft models to examine colorectal tumor evasion strategies, showing that these tumors promote immunosuppressive microenvironments characterized by recruitment and activation of regulatory T cells, myeloid-derived suppressor cells (MDSCs), and modulation of immune checkpoint pathways. HT-29 cell response to pro-inflammatory cytokines and chemokines significantly contributes to tumor progression and immune escape, so they are instrumental in studying colorectal tumor inflammation. These insights have implications for the development of novel anti-inflammatory or immunomodulatory cancer therapies targeting colorectal tumors.
