= Taste bud =

Taste receptor cells

Taste buds
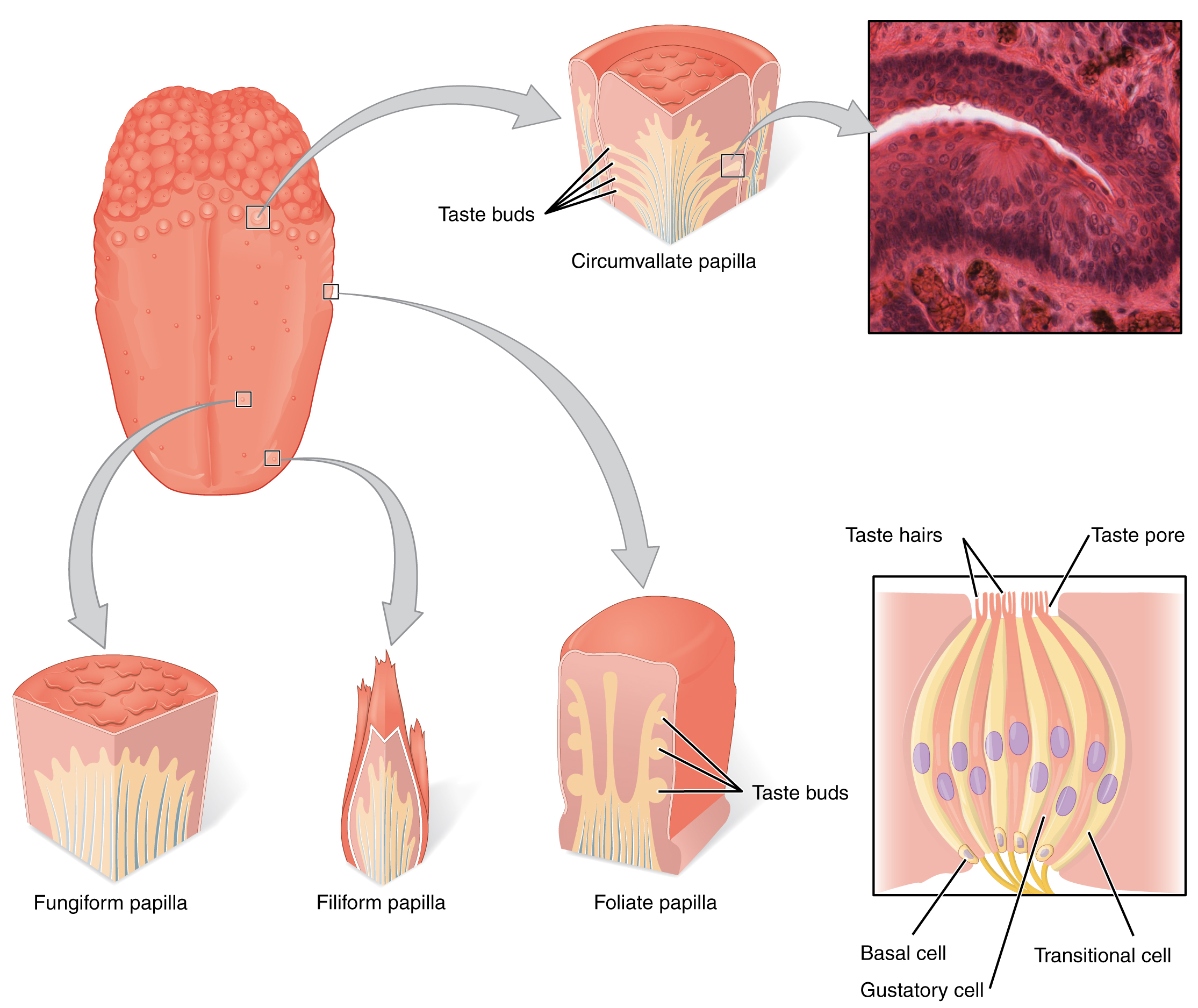
- Taste buds are small structures present within the papillae of the tongue

Details
- System: Taste

Identifiers
- Latin: caliculus gustatererius
- MeSH: D013650
- NeuroLex ID: birnlex_4101
- TA98: A15.4.00.002
- TA2: 7037
- TH: H3.04.01.0.02116, H3.04.01.0.03013
- FMA: 54825

Taste buds are clusters of taste receptor cells, which are also known as gustatory cells. The taste receptors are located around the small structures known as papillae found on the upper surface of the tongue, soft palate, upper esophagus, the cheek, and epiglottis. These structures are involved in detecting the five elements of taste perception: saltiness, sourness, bitterness, sweetness and savoriness (umami). A popular assumption assigns these different tastes to different regions of the tongue; in actuality, these tastes can be detected by any area of the tongue. Via small openings in the tongue epithelium, called taste pores, parts of the food dissolved in saliva come into contact with the taste receptors. These are located on top of the taste receptor cells that constitute the taste buds. The taste receptor cells send information detected by clusters of various receptors and ion channels to the gustatory areas of the brain via the seventh, ninth and tenth cranial nerves.

On average, the human tongue has 2,000–8,000 taste buds. The average lifespan of these is estimated to be 10 days.

== Types of papillae ==
The taste buds on the tongue sit on raised protrusions of the tongue surface called papillae. There are four types of lingual papillae; all except one contain taste buds:

- Fungiform papillae - as the name suggests, these are slightly mushroom-shaped if looked at in longitudinal section. These are present mostly at the dorsal surface of the tongue, as well as at the sides. Innervated by facial nerve.
- Foliate papillae - these are ridges and grooves towards the posterior part of the tongue found at the lateral borders. Innervated by facial nerve (anterior papillae) and glossopharyngeal nerve (posterior papillae).
- Circumvallate papillae - there are only about 10 to 14 of these papillae on most people, and they are present at the back of the oral part of the tongue. They are arranged in a circular-shaped row just in front of the sulcus terminalis of the tongue. They are associated with ducts of Von Ebner's glands, and are innervated by the glossopharyngeal nerve.
- Filiform papillae - the most numerous type but do not contain taste buds. They are characterized by increased keratinisation and are involved in the mechanical aspect of providing abrasion.

== Cell composition ==
The bud is formed by at least two main kinds of cells: supporting cells and gustatory cells. The supporting (sustentacular cells) are mostly arranged like the staves of a cask, and form an outer envelope for the bud. Some, however, are found in the interior of the bud between the gustatory cells. The gustatory (taste) cells, which are chemoreceptors, occupy the central portion of the bud; they are spindle-shaped, and each possesses a large spherical nucleus near the middle of the cell. The peripheral end of the cell terminates at the gustatory pore in a fine hair filament, the gustatory hair. The central process passes toward the deep extremity of the bud, and there ends in single or bifurcated varicosities. The nerve fibrils after losing their medullary sheaths enter the taste bud, and end in fine extremities between the gustatory cells; other nerve fibrils ramify between the supporting cells and terminate in fine extremities; these, however, are believed to be nerves of ordinary sensation and not gustatory.

Salt, sweet, sour and umami tastes cause depolarization of the taste cells, although different mechanisms are applied. Bitter causes an internal release of Ca^{2+}, no external Ca^{2+} is required.

=== Type I taste bud cell ===
The type I taste bud cells make up about half of the cells in the taste buds, express ion channels and have, apparently, glia-like functions. In electronic microscopy they show up as electron-dense. They are considered to have heterogeneous gene expression patterns.

=== Type II taste bud cell ===
The type II taste bud cells make up about another third of the cells in the taste bud and express G-protein coupled receptors that are associated with chemoreception. They usually express either type 1 or type 2 taste receptors, but one cell might detect different stimuli, such as umami and sweetness.

== See also ==
- Tongue map
