= Pen-Strep =

Antibiotic

- Chemical structures of pennicllin G (top) and streptomycin

Names
- Other names Penicillin-streptomycin

Identifiers
CAS Number	8025-06-7
3D model (JSmol)	Interactive image
PubChem CID	71311919
- InChI: InChI=1S/C23H43N7O12.C16H18N2O4S/c1-7-23(38,6-32)18(42-19-8(5-28-2)12(33)13(34)9(40-19)3-4-31)20(39-7)41-17-11(30-22(26)27)14(35)10(29-21(24)25)15(36)16(17)37;1-16(2)12(15(21)22)18-13(20)11(14(18)23-16)17-10(19)8-9-6-4-3-5-7-9/h6-20,28,31,33-38H,3-5H2,1-2H3,(H4,24,25,29)(H4,26,27,30);3-7,11-12,14H,8H2,1-2H3,(H,17,19)(H,21,22)/t7-,8-,9-,10+,11-,12-,13-,14+,15-,16+,17+,18-,19-,20-,23?;11-,12+,14-/m01/s1 Key: KMOOCZWLFBSQCW-WZVSWZHRSA-N
- SMILES: C[C@H]1C([C@H]([C@@H](O1)O[C@@H]2[C@H]([C@@H]([C@H]([C@@H]([C@H]2O)O)N=C(N)N)O)N=C(N)N)O[C@H]3[C@H]([C@@H]([C@H]([C@@H](O3)CCO)O)O)CNC)(C=O)O.CC1([C@@H](N2[C@H](S1)[C@@H](C2=O)NC(=O)CC3=CC=CC=C3)C(=O)O)C

Properties
Chemical formula	C_{39}H_{61}N_{9}O_{16}S
Molar mass	944.02 g·mol^{−1}
- Except where otherwise noted, data are given for materials in their standard state (at 25 °C [77 °F], 100 kPa). Infobox references

Pen-Strep (also known as penicillin-streptomycin) is a mixture of penicillin G and streptomycin (or dihydrostreptomycin) that is widely used in mammalian cell culture media to prevent bacterial contamination. The solution contains 5,000 units of penicillin G (sodium salt) which acts as the active base, and 5,000 micrograms of streptomycin (sulfate) (base per milliliter), formulated in 0.85% saline. In general, 50-100 units of Pen-Strep per milliliter of media is used to avoid contamination in cell culture. Thus, the retail product is generally 100 times more concentrated. It is recommended for use in cell culture applications at a concentration of 10 ml per liter. It is the most common antibiotic solution for the culture of mammalian cells and it does not have any adverse effects on the cells themselves. It was first introduced in 1955 in cell culture.

Penicillin is a beta-lactam antibiotic that is effective in inhibiting Gram-positive bacteria, whereas streptomycin is an aminoglycoside antibiotic which is effective against most Gram-negative bacteria.

== Advantages and disadvantages ==
Penicillin is a narrow spectrum antibiotic against Gram-positive bacteria and is relatively inexpensive, but penicillin can cause hypersensitivity reactions and is unstable in acid and alkaline pH environments. Streptomycin and dihydrostreptomycin are broad spectrum antibiotics against Gram-negative bacteria and is also relatively inexpensive, but can be rapidly destroyed at alkaline pH environments. The cell culture media is generally neutral in pH which is why Pen-Strep is still widely used in mammalian cell culture. For the purpose of contamination control in cell culture, gentamicin sulfate or kanamycin sulfate are also commonly used.
