= Neurilemma =

Layer present on Schwann cells of CNS neurons

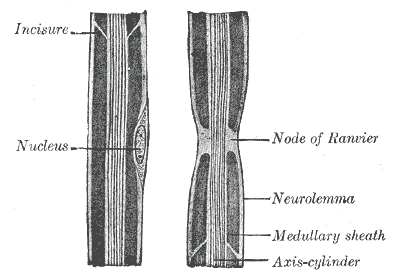
- Diagram of longitudinal sections of medullated nerve fibers.

- Cross section of an axon.: 1. Axon; 2. Nucleus of Schwann cell 3. Schwann cell 4. Myelin sheath; 5. Neurilemma

Details
- System: Peripheral nervous system
- Location: Schwann cell

Identifiers
- MeSH: D009441
- TH: H2.00.06.1.00002

Neurilemma (also known as neurolema, sheath of Schwann, or Schwann's sheath) is the outermost nucleated cytoplasmic layer of Schwann cells (also called neurilemmocytes) that surrounds the axon of the neuron. It forms the outermost layer of the nerve fiber in the peripheral nervous system.

The neurilemma is underlain by the myelin sheath (also known as the medullary sheath). In the central nervous system, axons are myelinated by oligodendrocytes, thus lack neurilemma. The myelin sheaths of oligodendrocytes do not have neurilemma because excess cytoplasm is directed centrally toward the oligodendrocyte cell body.

Neurilemma serves a protective function for peripheral nerve fibers. Damaged nerve fibers may regenerate if the cell body is not damaged and the neurilemma remains intact. The neurilemma forms a regeneration tube through which the growing axon re-establishes its original connection.

Neurilemoma is a tumor of the neurilemma.
