= Neuroeffector junction =

Site where a motor neuron releases a neurotransmitter to affect a target cell

A neuroeffector junction is a site where a motor neuron releases a neurotransmitter to affect a target—non-neuronal—cell. This junction functions like a synapse. However, unlike most neurons, somatic efferent motor neurons innervate skeletal muscle, and are always excitatory. Visceral efferent neurons innervate smooth muscle, cardiac muscle, and glands, and have the ability to be either excitatory or inhibitory in function. Neuroeffector junctions are known as neuromuscular junctions when the target cell is a muscle fiber.

Non-synaptic transmission is characteristic of autonomic neuroeffector junctions. The structure of the autonomic neuromuscular junction consists of several essential features including that: the terminal portions of autonomic nerve fibers are varicose and mobile, transmitters being released 'en passage' from varying distances from the effector cells; while there is no structural post-junctional specialization on effector cells, receptors for neurotransmitters accumulate on cell membranes at close junctions. Muscle effectors are bundles rather than single smooth muscle cells that are connected by gap junctions which allow electrotonic spread of activity between cells. A multiplicity of transmitters are utilized by autonomic nerves, and co-transmission occurs often involving synergistic actions of the co-transmitters, although pre- and post-junctional neuromodulation of neurotransmitter release also take place. It is suggested that autonomic neural control of immune, epithelial and endothelial cells also involves non-synaptic transmission.

These are tight junctions, but in the autonomic nervous system and enteric nervous system the connecting junctions become much "looser", allowing for easier diffusion. This looseness allows for a wider signal receiving whereas in tighter junctions, more neurotransmitters get metabolized or broken down. In skeletal muscles, the junctions are mostly of the same distance and size because they innervate such definite structures of muscle fibers. In the Autonomic Nervous System however, these neuromuscular junctions are much less well defined.

Analysis of non-noradrenergic/non-cholinergic (NANC) transmission at single varicosities or swellings indicates that individual synapses possess different probabilities for the secretion of transmitter as well as different complements of autoreceptors and mixtures of post-junctional receptor subunits. There is then a local determination of the quantitative properties of single synapses.

Nerve terminals are the terminal part of the axon filled with neurotransmitters and are the location from which neurotransmitters are released. Nerve terminals may take different forms in different tissues. Nerve terminals appear like a button in the CNS, end plates in striated muscle and varicosities in many tissues including the gut. Buttons, endplates or varicosities all function to store and release neurotransmitters. In many peripheral tissues, the varicose axon branches in its proximal course and carries a covering of Schwann sheath, which is interrupted and finally lost in its most terminal part. The unmyelinated, preterminal axons with very long varicose branches are present in small axon bundles and varicose terminal axons are present as single isolated axons. The small axon bundles run parallel to and between muscle bundles and the "en passage" varicose axons are the main sources of innervations to the gut smooth muscle bundles.

Nonsynaptic post-junctional receptors are mostly G-protein coupled metabotropic receptors that produce a slower response. They include metabotropic receptors for the classical neurotransmitters, monoamines, norepinephrine, purines and peptide transmitters. Post-junctional receptors also include some ionotropic receptors such as nicotinic receptors in the central nervous system (CNS) as well as the autonomic nervous system (ANS).

Nonsynaptic junctional transmission is the only mode of transmission involving the varicosities that show no synaptic contacts that includes almost all nerve terminals whose target is not a neuron. Most smooth muscles exhibit both fast and slow junction potentials typically mediated by different classes of metabotropic receptors with different kinetics.

The close junctional neurotransmission is characterized by synapse like close contact between the pre-junctional release site and the post-junctional receptors. However, unlike the synapse, the junctional space is open to the extravascular space; the pre-junctional release site lacks the distinguishing features of the presynaptic active zone and release of the soluble transmitters; and the post junctional receptors include metabotropic receptors or slower acting ionotropic receptors.

Almost all tissues that exhibit close junctional neurotransmission also show wide junctional neurotransmission. Thus, wide junctional transmission has been described in many smooth muscles such as vas deferens, urinary bladder, blood vessels, gut as well as the nervous systems including ENS, autonomic ganglia and the CNS.

Control of gastrointestinal (GI) movements by enteric motoneurons is critical for orderly processing of food, absorption of nutrients and elimination of wastes. Neuroeffector junctions in the tunica muscularis might consist of synaptic-like connectivity with specialized cells, and contributions from multiple cell types in integrated post-junctional responses. Interstitial cells of Cajal (ICC) – non-muscular cells of mesenchymal origin—were proposed as potential mediators in motor neurotransmission. Neuromuscular junctions in GI smooth muscles may reflect innervation of, and post-junctional responses in, all three classes of post-junctional cells. Transduction of neurotransmitter signals by ICC cells and activation of ionic conductances would be conducted electronically via gap junctions to surrounding smooth muscle cells and influence the excitability of tissues.

Neuromuscular junction. 1. Axon innervating muscle fibers; 2. Junction between axon and muscle fiber; 3. Muscle; 4. Muscle fiber

== Discovery ==
In the peripheral nervous system, local junctional transmission was recognized in the late 1960s and early 1970s. Until then, all chemical neurotransmission was thought to involve synapses and the innervations of tissue were considered synonymous with the existence of a synapse. Later, it was observed that at smooth muscle neuromuscular junctions in the gut and other peripheral autonomic neuroeffector junctions, neurotransmission takes place in the absence of any synapses and it was suggested that at these sites, neurotransmission involved non-synaptic transmission. Accordingly, nerve endings release their neurotransmitters in extracellular space in a manner similar to paracrine secretion. Target cells affected by a locally released transmitter even though located several hundreds to thousands of nanometers away from the release site are considered as being innervated.

The varicose axons were first visualized for adrenergic terminals using fluorescence histochemistry described by Falck and colleagues.

These varicose axons resemble strings of beads with varicosities 0.5–2.0 μ in diameter and 1 to 3 μ in length and separated by inter-varicosity axon 0.1 to 0.2 μ in diameter. The varicosities occur at 2–10 μm intervals and it has been estimated that a single adrenergic axon may have over 25,000 varicosities on its terminal part. There are also two types of contacts. These contacts are called large and small contacts, respectively. In the large contacts, the bare varicosities and the smooth muscles were separated by ~60 nm and in the small contacts the two were separated by ~400 nm. Overall, non-synaptic junctional space between the neural release site and the post-junctional receptors may show variable degrees of separation between the release site on the pre-junctional nerve terminal and the post-junctional receptors on the target cell.

The discovery of NANC inhibitory and excitatory transmission as well as the fact that such transmission has to be considered as occurring to smooth muscle cells coupled together in an electrical Autonomic postganglionic nerves terminate in systems syncytium and that the excitatory NANC transmission of collateral branches, each of which possesses of the order gives rise to a calcium-dependent action potential.

== Research ==
Neuromuscular junctions in gastrointestinal (GI) smooth muscles may reflect innervation of, and post-junctional responses in, all three classes of post-junctional cells. Transduction of neurotransmitter signals by ICC cells and activation of ionic conductances would be conducted electronically via gap junctions to surrounding smooth muscle cells and influence excitability.

Studies do not exclude the possibility of parallel excitatory neurotransmission to ICC-DMP (deep muscular plexus) and smooth muscle cells. Different cells may utilize different receptors and signaling molecules. ICC are innervated and transmitters reach high enough concentration to activate post-junctional signaling pathways in ICC. If ICC are important intermediaries in motor neurotransmission, then loss of these cells could reduce communication between the enteric nervous system and the smooth muscle syncytium, resulting in reduced neural regulation of motility.

In pioneering studies it was shown unequivocally that the innervation of smooth muscles is by varicose nerve terminals. However, it was not until the advent of the electron microscope that we were able to provide us with a comprehensive view of the relationship between these varicose endings and smooth muscle.

Besides activation of K+ channels by NO, some authors have suggested that Ca2+-activated Cl− channels, which are active under basal conditions, can be suppressed as part of the post-junctional response to NO. These studies do not exclude the possibility of parallel excitatory neurotransmission to ICC-DMP and smooth muscle cells. Different cells may utilize different receptors and signaling molecules. These findings make the point that ICC are innervated and transmitters reach high enough concentration to activate post-junctional signaling pathways in ICC. There is no reason to assume a priori that responses to neurotransmitters released from neurons and exogenous transmitter substances are mediated by the same cells, receptors or post-junctional (transduction) signaling pathways. Neurotransmitters released from varicosities may be spatially limited to specific populations of receptors, whereas transmitters added to organ baths may bind to receptors on a variety of cells.

== Structure and function ==
Non-synaptic transmission is characteristic of autonomic neuroeffector junctions. The essential features are that: the terminal portions of autonomic nerve fibers are varicose and mobile; transmitters are released from varicosities at varying distances from the effector cells; and while there is no structural post-junctional specialization on effector cells, receptors for neurotransmitters accumulate on cell membranes at close junctions. Besides smooth muscle, autonomic neural control of immune, epithelial, and endothelial cells also involves nonsynaptic transmission. Smooth muscle effectors are bundles rather than single cells, that are connected by gap junctions which allow electrotonic spread of activity between cells. Many smooth muscle cells in a transverse section through a muscle bundle show regions of very close apposition to adjacent cells at which connexins form junctions between the cells. Unlike in cardiac muscle, where gap junctions are confined to the ends of cardiac myocytes, smooth muscle gap junctions occur along the length of the muscle cells as well as towards their ends. There are small bundles of three to seven varicose axons, partially or wholly enveloped in Schwann-cell sheath, both on the surface of the muscle as well as in the body of smooth muscle bundles. In addition, single varicose axons can be found on the surface and in the muscle bundles, and become divested of Schwann cells in the region of apposition between the varicosities and smooth muscle cells.

The active zone of individual sympathetic varicosities, delineated by a high concentration of syntaxin, occupies an area on the pre-junctional membrane of about 0.2 μm^{2}; this gives a junctional gap between the pre-junctional active zone and post-junctional membranes that varies between about 50 and 100 nm. The post-junctional membrane beneath the varicosity can possess a patch about 1 μm^{2} of purinergic P2X1 receptors in high density, although this is not always the case. A nerve impulse gives rise to a transient increase in calcium concentration in every varicosity, primarily due to the opening of N-type calcium channels, as well as to a smaller increase in the intervaricose regions. The probability of secretion from a varicosity may depend on the number of secretosomes that the varicosity possesses, where a secretosome is a complex of syntaxin, synaptotagmin, an N-type calcium channel, and a synaptic vesicle.

A multiplicity of transmitters are utilized by autonomic nerves, and cotransmission occurs, often involving synergistic actions of the cotransmitters, although pre- and post-junctional neuromodulation of neurotransmitter release also take place. Cotransmission without co-storage occurs in parasympathetic nerves, where terminals staining for the vesicular acetylcholine transporter can also contain nitric oxide synthase, suggesting that they release NO as a gaseous neurotransmitter.

Neuroeffector Ca^{2+} transients (NCT) have been used to detect the packeted release of the neurotransmitter ATP acting on post-junctional P2X receptors to cause the Ca^{2+} influx. ATP released from varicosities is modulated by the concomitant release of noradrenaline that acts on the varicosities through α2-adrenoceptors to decrease the influx of calcium ions that accompanies the nerve impulse. NCT can also be used to detect the local effects of noradrenaline through its α2-adrenoceptor-mediated pre-junctional autoinhibitory effects on nerve terminal Ca^{2+} concentration and the probability of exocytosis (measured by counting NCTs). There is evidence that exocytosis from sympathetic varicosities depends on their history, and that the release of a packet of ATP transiently suppresses (or predicts the transient suppression of) subsequent release. The poverty of NCTs occurring within 5s of one another indicates that exocytosis from a varicosity transiently suppresses the probability of release from that varicosity. This could arise by autoinhibition (by the pre-junctional action of noradrenaline or purines) or due to a transient shortage of vesicles readily available for release.

ATP release (hence noradrenaline release, if there is strict corelease) is highly intermittent at these junctions (Brain et al. 2002), with a probability that a given action potential will evoke the release from a given varicosity of only 0.019. If there are n varicosities within the diffusion range of a particular varicosity, we can consider the number of such varicosities that might need to be present in order that, on average (using P =0.5 to give the median value), neurotransmitter will be released locally. During a five-impulse train, assuming that the last impulse in the train cannot autoinhibit the Ca^{2+} influx during the train, the expectation value of n can be found by solving [(1 − 0.019)^{4n}] =(1 − 0.5), i.e. the probability that there will be no local release, given n varicosities within the diffusion range. This is n = [ln(0.5)/ln(0.981)]/4, or n≈9. If the density of varicosities is around 2.2 per 1000 μm^{3}, this number of varicosities should occur within an average range (radius) of about 10 μm (noting that within such a radius there is a tissue volume of about 4200 μm^{3}). Therefore, even in the presence of highly intermittent noradrenaline release, one would expect the average varicosity in this organ to be within 10 μm of a released packet of noradrenaline at some time during a five-impulse stimulus train (excluding the last impulse).

Junctional transmission is measured in seconds to minutes. The time course of the junctional potential has been divided into two most frequently observed time courses representing 'close' and 'wide' junctional transmissions. The "close" junctional transmission is associated with fast junction potential and the "wide" junctional transmission is associated with slow junction potential. The slow electrical potentials reach a peak in about 150 ms and then decline with a time constant between 250 and 500 ms. These responses typically last several seconds to minutes and may be depolarizing and excitatory, or hyperpolarizing and inhibitory, and have been called slow EJP or slow IJP, respectively.

== Interstitial cells of Cajal ==
Over the past 20 years, many studies have given evidence that Interstitial cells of Cajal (ICC): (i) serve as pacemaker cells with unique ionic currents that generate electrical slow waves in GI muscles; (ii) provide a pathway for active slow wave propagation in GI organs; (iii) express receptors, transduction mechanisms and ionic conductances allowing them to mediate post-junctional responses to enteric motor neurotransmission; (iv) regulate smooth muscle excitability by contributing to resting potential and affecting syncytial conductance; and (v) manifest stretch-receptor functions regulating excitability and regulating slow wave frequency.

If this channel is open, conductance changes in cell are reflected in smooth muscle; post-junctional integrated responses are triggered by neuroeffector junctions and interstitial cells.

Based on anatomic location and function, two main types of ICC have been described: myenteric ICC (ICC-MY) and intramuscular ICC (ICC-IM). ICC-MY are present around the myenteric plexus and thought to be pacemaker cells for slow waves in the smooth muscle cells. Calcium imaging studies in the colon have shown that ICC-MY is innervated by nitrergic and cholinergic nerve terminals, though the nature of the contacts has not been well defined. ICC-IM is located in between the smooth muscle cells. Enteric nerves have been reported to make synaptic contacts with ICC-IM. These contacts include areas of electron dense lining on the inner aspect of the varicosity membrane without any postsynaptic density on the membrane of ICC. Such contacts were not reported between the nerves and the smooth muscles. If ICC are important intermediaries in motor neurotransmission, then loss of these cells could reduce communication between the enteric nervous system and the smooth muscle syncytium, resulting in reduced neural regulation of motility.

Classical excitatory and inhibitory neurotransmitters are concentrated and released from neurovesicles located in enteric nerve terminals or varicose regions of motor nerves, whereas nitric oxide is probably synthesized de novo as calcium concentration increases in nerve terminals upon membrane depolarization. Enteric nerve terminals make intimate synapses with ICC-IM, which are situated between the nerve terminals and neighbouring smooth muscle cells. ICC-IM play a critical role in the reception and transduction of cholinergic excitatory and nitrergic inhibitory neurotransmission. ICC-IM form gap junctions with smooth muscle cells and post-junctional electrical responses generated in ICC are conducted to the smooth muscle syncytium. By this contact, ICC can regulate the neuromuscular responses observed throughout the GI tract. Recent morphological evidence using anterograde tracing methods, has shown close apposition between vagal and spinal afferents and ICC-IM within the stomach wall (Fig. 5) and their absence in mutant animals that lack ICC-IM also supports a role for ICC-IM as possible integrators for in-series stretch-dependent changes in this organ.
