= Satellite glial cell =

Cells covering neuron soma in PNS ganglia

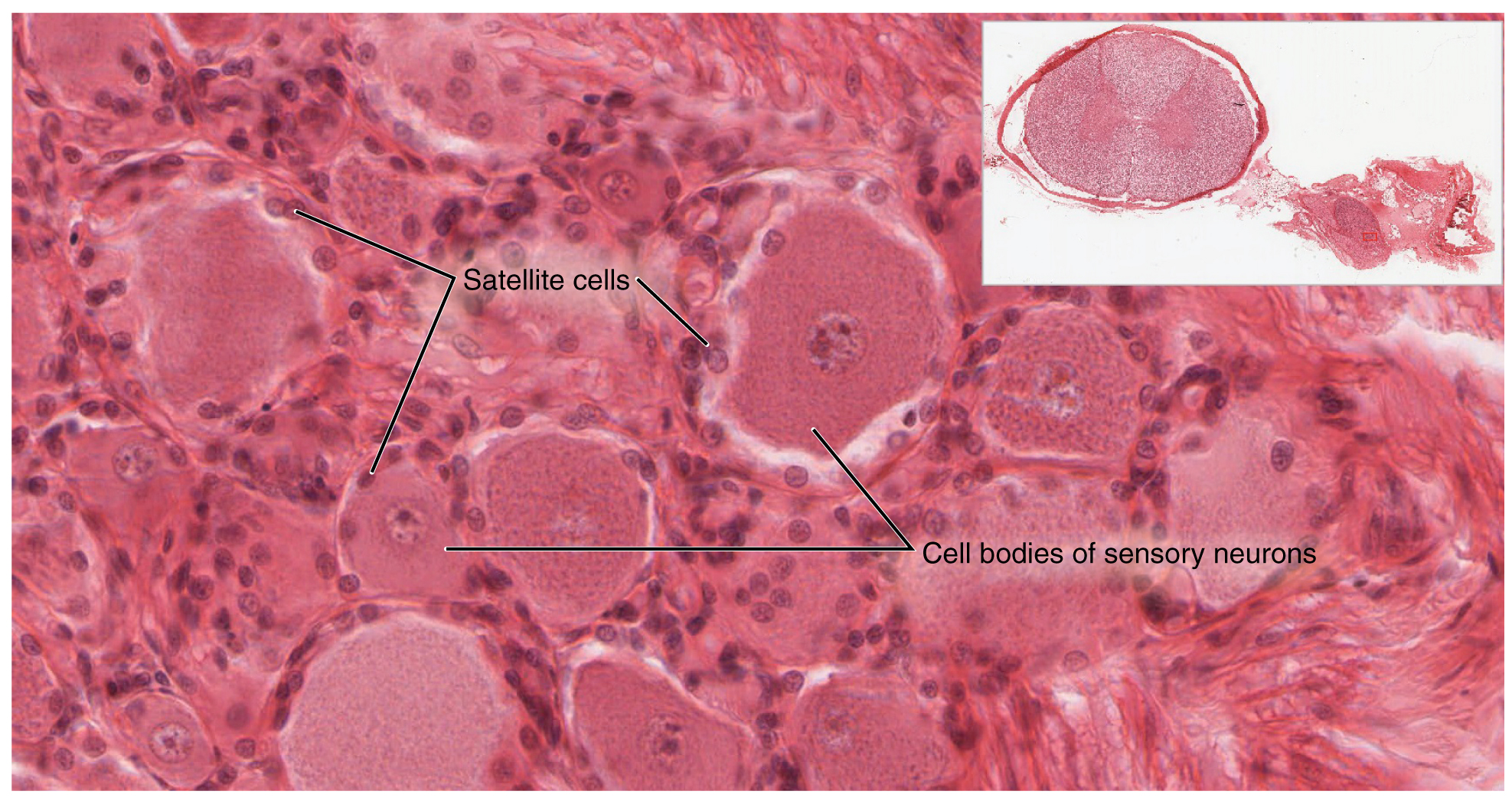
- Satellite glial cells surround the cell bodies of sensory neurons

Details
- Location: Surface of neuron bodies in sensory, sympathetic and parasympathetic ganglia

Identifiers
- Latin: gliocytus ganglionicus
- MeSH: D027161
- NeuroLex ID: sao792373294
- TH: H2.00.06.2.02002

Satellite glial cells, formerly called amphicytes, are glial cells that cover the surface of neuron cell bodies in ganglia of the peripheral nervous system. Thus, they are found in sensory, sympathetic, and parasympathetic ganglia. Both satellite glial cells (SGCs) and Schwann cells (the cells that ensheathe some nerve fibers in the PNS) are derived from the neural crest of the embryo during development. SGCs have been found to play a variety of roles, including control over the microenvironment of sympathetic ganglia. They are thought to have a similar role to astrocytes in the central nervous system (CNS). They supply nutrients to the surrounding neurons and also have some structural function. Satellite cells also act as protective, cushioning cells. Additionally, they express a variety of receptors that allow for a range of interactions with neuroactive chemicals. Many of these receptors and other ion channels have recently been implicated in health issues including chronic pain and herpes simplex. There is much more to be learned about these cells, and research surrounding additional properties and roles of the SGCs is ongoing.

== Structure ==
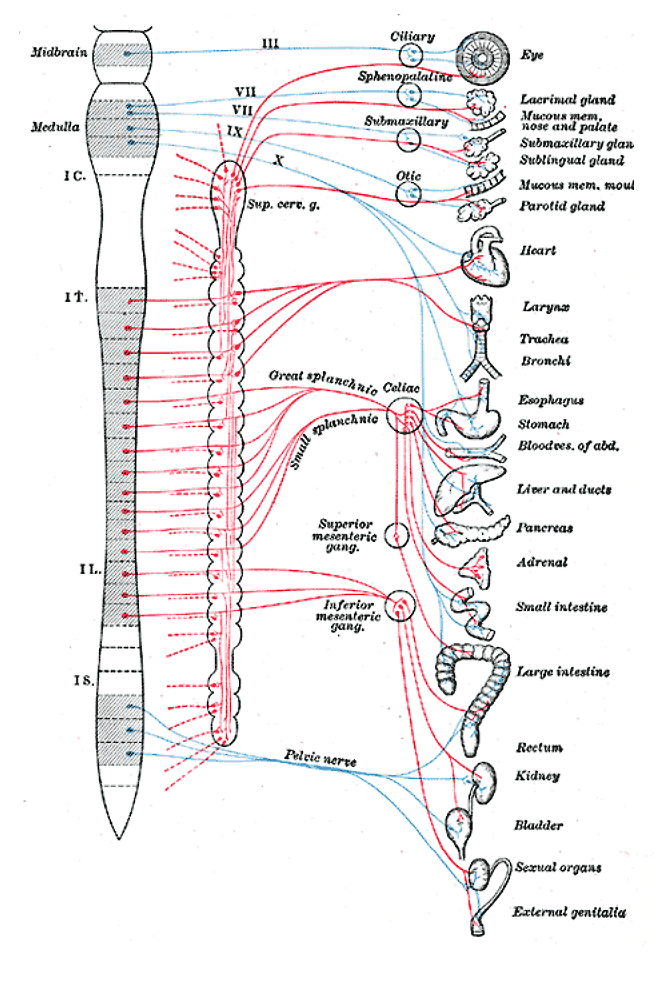
Satellite glial cells are expressed throughout the sympathetic and parasympathetic ganglia in their respective nervous system divisions.

Satellite glial cells are a type of glia found in the peripheral nervous system, specifically in sensory, sympathetic, and parasympathetic ganglia. They compose the thin cellular sheaths that surround the individual neurons in these ganglia.

In a SGC, the cell body is denoted by the region containing the single, relatively large nucleus. Each side of the cell body extends outward, forming perineuronal processes. The region containing the nucleus has the largest volume of cytoplasm, making this region of the SGC sheath thicker. The sheath can be even thicker if multiple SGCs are layered on top of one another, each measuring 0.1 micrometres (3.9×10^{−6} in).

Despite their flattened shape, satellite glial cells contain all common organelles necessary to make cellular products and to maintain the homeostatic environment of the cell. The plasma membrane of SGCs is thin and not very dense, and it is associated with adhesion molecules, receptors for neurotransmitters and other molecules, and ion channels, specifically potassium ion channels. Within individual SGCs, there is both rough endoplasmic reticulum and smooth endoplasmic reticulum, but the latter is much less abundant. Most often the Golgi apparatus and the centrioles in an SGC are found in a region very close to the cell's nucleus. On the other hand, mitochondria are found throughout the cytoplasm along with the organelles involved in autophagy and other forms of catabolic degradation, such as lysosomes, lipofuscin granules, and peroxisomes. Both microtubules and intermediate filaments can be seen throughout the cytoplasm, and most often they lie parallel to the SGC sheath. These filaments are found in greater concentrations at the axon hillock and at the beginning portion of an axon in an SGC of the sympathetic ganglia. In some SGCs of the sensory ganglia researchers have seen a single cilium that extends outward from the cell surface near the nucleus and into the extracellular space of a deep indentation in the plasma membrane. The cilium, however, only has the nine pairs of peripheral microtubules while it lacks the axial pair of microtubules, making its structure very similar to the cilia of neurons, Schwann cells, and astrocytes of the CNS.

=== In sensory ganglia ===
Satellite glial cells in sensory ganglia are laminar cells that wrap around sensory neurons. An envelope of multiple SGCs completely surrounds each sensory neuron. The number of SGCs that make up the sheath increases proportionately with the volume of the neuron which it surrounds. Additionally, the volume of the sheath itself increases proportionately with the volume and surface area of the neuron's somata. The distance of extracellular space between the sheath and the neuronal plasma membrane measures 20 nanometres (7.9×10^{−7} in), allowing the neuron and its SGC sheath to form a single anatomical and functional unit. These individual units are separated by areas of connective tissue. However, there are some sensory neurons that occupy the same space within connective tissue and are therefore grouped together in a “cluster” of two or three neurons. Most often each individual neuron in a cluster is still surrounded by its own SGC sheath, but in some cases it is missing. Some sensory neurons have small projections called microvilli that extend outward from their cell surfaces. Due to their close proximity to the SGC sheath, these microvilli of the neuronal plasma membrane reach into the grooves of the sheath, allowing for possible exchange of materials between the cells.

=== In sympathetic ganglia ===
In the sympathetic ganglia, satellite glial cells are one of three main types of cells, the other two being the sympathetic ganglion neurons and small intensely fluorescent (SIF) cells. SIF cells of sympathetic ganglia are separated into groups, each of which is surrounded by an SGC sheath. The SGCs of the sympathetic ganglia come from the neural crest and do not proliferate during embryonic development until the neurons are present and mature, indicating that the neurons signal the division and maturation of the SGCs. The SGCs of sympathetic ganglia follow the same basic structure as the SGCs of sensory ganglia, except that sympathetic ganglia also receive synapses. Therefore, the SGC sheath of sympathetic neurons must extend even further to cover the axon hillock near the somata. Like the regions of the sheath near the glial nucleus, the regions of the sheath at the axon hillocks are thicker than those surrounding the rest of the neuron. This indicates that the SGCs play a role in the synaptic environment, thereby influencing synaptic transmission.

=== Differences from other glial cells ===
Many people liken SGCs to the astrocytes of the CNS because they share certain anatomical and physiological properties, such as the presence of neurotransmitter transporters and the expression of glutamine synthetase. However, there are distinguishing factors that put SGCs in their own distinct category of glial cells. SGCs most often surround individual sensory and parasympathetic neurons with a complete, unbroken sheath while most neurons of sympathetic ganglia lack a completely continuous SGC sheath, allowing for limited direct exchange of materials between the extracellular space of the neuron and the space within the connective tissue where the SGCs are situated. Furthermore, gap junctions exist between SGCs in the sheaths of adjacent neurons as well as between SGCs in the same sheath (reflexive gap junctions). These gap junctions have been identified through the use of electron microscopy and weight tracer markers, such as Lucifer yellow or neurobiotin. The degree to which SGCs are coupled to SGCs of another sheath or to SGCs of the same sheath is dependent on the pH of the cellular environment.

From studies on rats and mice, researchers have found that satellite glial cells express many neurotransmitter receptors, such as muscarinic acetylcholine and erythropoietin receptors. In order to differentiate between SGCs and other glial cells researchers have used markers to identify which proteins are found in different cells. Although SGCs express glial fibrillary acidic protein (GFAP) and different S-100 proteins, the most useful marker available today for SGC identification is glutamine synthetase (GS). The levels of GS are relatively low at rest, but they greatly increase if the neuron undergoes axonal damage. Furthermore, SGCs also possess mechanisms to release cytokines, adenosine triphosphate (ATP), and other chemical messengers.

== Function ==
Research is currently ongoing in determining the physiological role of satellite glial cells. Current theories suggest that SGCs have a significant role in controlling the microenvironment of the sympathetic ganglia. This is based on the observation that SGCs almost completely envelop the neuron and can regulate the diffusion of molecules across the cell membrane. It has been previously shown that when fluorescent protein tracers are injected into the cervical ganglion in order to bypass the circulatory system, they are not found on the neuron surface. This suggests that the SGCs can regulate the extracellular space of individual neurons. Some speculate that SGCs in the autonomic ganglia have a similar role to the blood–brain barrier as a functional barrier to large molecules.

SGCs role as a regulator of neuronal microenvironment is further characterized by its electrical properties which are very similar to those of astrocytes. Astrocytes have a well studied and defined role in controlling the microenvironment within the brain, therefore researchers are investigating any homologous role of SGCs within the sympathetic ganglia. An established mode of controlling the microenvironment in sensory ganglia is the uptake of substances by specialized transporters which carry neurotransmitters into cells when coupled with Na^{+} and Cl^{−}. Transporters for glutamate and gamma-Aminobutyric acid (GABA) have been found in SGCs. They appear to be actively engaged in the control of the composition of the extracellular space of the ganglia. The enzyme glutamine synthetase, which catalyzes the conversion of glutamate into glutamine, is found in large amounts in SGCs. Additionally, SGCs contain the glutamate related enzymes glutamate dehydrogenase and pyruvate carboxylase, and thus can supply the neurons not only with glutamine, but also with malate and lactate.

=== Molecular properties ===
Unlike their adjacent neurons, SGCs do not have synapses but are equipped with receptors for a variety of neuroactive substances that are analogous to those found in neurons. Axon terminals as well as other parts of the neuron carry receptors to substances such as acetylcholine (ACh), GABA, glutamate, ATP, noradrenaline, substance P, and capsaicin that directly affect the physiology of these cells. Current research is revealing that SGCs are also able to respond to some of the same chemical stimuli as neurons. The research is ongoing and SGCs role in injury repair mechanisms is not yet fully understood.

==== Molecular characteristics of SGCs ====
Molecule	Type of Ganglia	Method of Detection	Comments
Glutamine synthetase	Mouse TG	IHC	Catalyzes the condensation of glutamate and ammonia to form glutamine
GFAP	Rat DRG, TG	IHC	Upregulated by nerve damage
S100	Rat DRG	IHC	Upregulated by nerve damage
Endothelin ET_{B} receptor	Rat, rabbit DRG	IHC, autoradiography	Blockers of ETs are shown to alleviate pain in animal models
Bradykinin B_{2} receptor	Rat DRG	Electrophysiology	Involved in the inflammatory process
P2Y receptor	Mouse TG	Ca^{2+} imaging, IHC	Contributes to nociception
ACh muscarinic receptor	Rat DRG	IHC, mRNA (ISH)	Role not well defined in sensory ganglia
NGF trkA receptor	Rat DRG	Immuno-EM	May play a role in response to neuronal injury
TGFα	Rat DRG	mRNA (ISH), IHC	Stimulates neural proliferation after injury
Erythropoietin receptor	Rat DRG	IHC	
TNF-α	Mouse DRG, TG	IHC	Inflammatory mediator increased by nerve crush, herpes simplex activation
IL-6	Mouse TG	IHC	Cytokine released during inflammation, increased by UV irradiation
ERK	Rat DRG	IHC	Involved in functions including the regulation of meiosis, and mitosis
JAK2	Rat DRG	IHC	Signaling protein a part of the type II cytokine receptor family
Somatostatin sst1 receptor	Rat DRG	IHC	Somatostatin inhibits the release of many hormones and other secretory proteins
GABA transporter	Rat DRG	Autoradiography	
Glutamate transporter	Rat DRG	mRNA (ISH), IHC, Autoradiography	Terminates the excitatory neurotransmitter signal by removal (uptake) of glutamate
Guanylate cyclase	Rat DRG, TG	IHC for cGMP	Second messenger that internalizes the message carried by intercellular messengers such as peptide hormones and NO
PGD synthase	Chick DRG	IHC	Known to function as a neuromodulator as well as a trophic factor in the central nervous system

== Clinical significance ==
=== Chronic pain ===
Glial cells, including SGCs, have long been recognized for their roles in response to neuronal damage and injury. SCGs have specifically been implicated in a new role involving the creation and persistence of chronic pain, which may involve hyperalgesia and other forms of spontaneous pain.

==== Secretion of bioactive molecules ====
SGCs have the ability to release cytokines and other bioactive molecules that transmit pain neuronally. Neurotrophins and tumor necrosis factor α (TNFα) are other cellular factors that work to sensitize neurons to pain. SGCs are present in the PNS in fewer numbers than other more well-known types of glial cells, like astrocytes, but have been determined to affect nociception because of some of their physiological and pharmacological properties. In fact, just like astrocytes, SGCs have the ability to sense and regulate neighboring neuronal activity. First, after a period of nerve cell injury, SGCs are known to up-regulate GFAP and to undergo cell division. They have the ability to release chemoattractants, which are analogous to those released by Schwann cells and contribute to the recruitment and proliferation of macrophages. Additionally, several research groups have found that SGC coupling increases after nerve damage, which has an effect on the perception of pain, likely for several reasons. Normally, the gap junctions between SGCs are used in order to redistribute potassium ions between adjacent cells. However, in coupling of SGCs, the number of gap junctions greatly increases. This may possibly be to deal with larger amounts of ATP and glutamate, which eventually leads to increased recycling of the glutamate. The increased levels of glutamate lead to over excitation and an increase in nociception.

==== Expression of receptors and ion channels ====
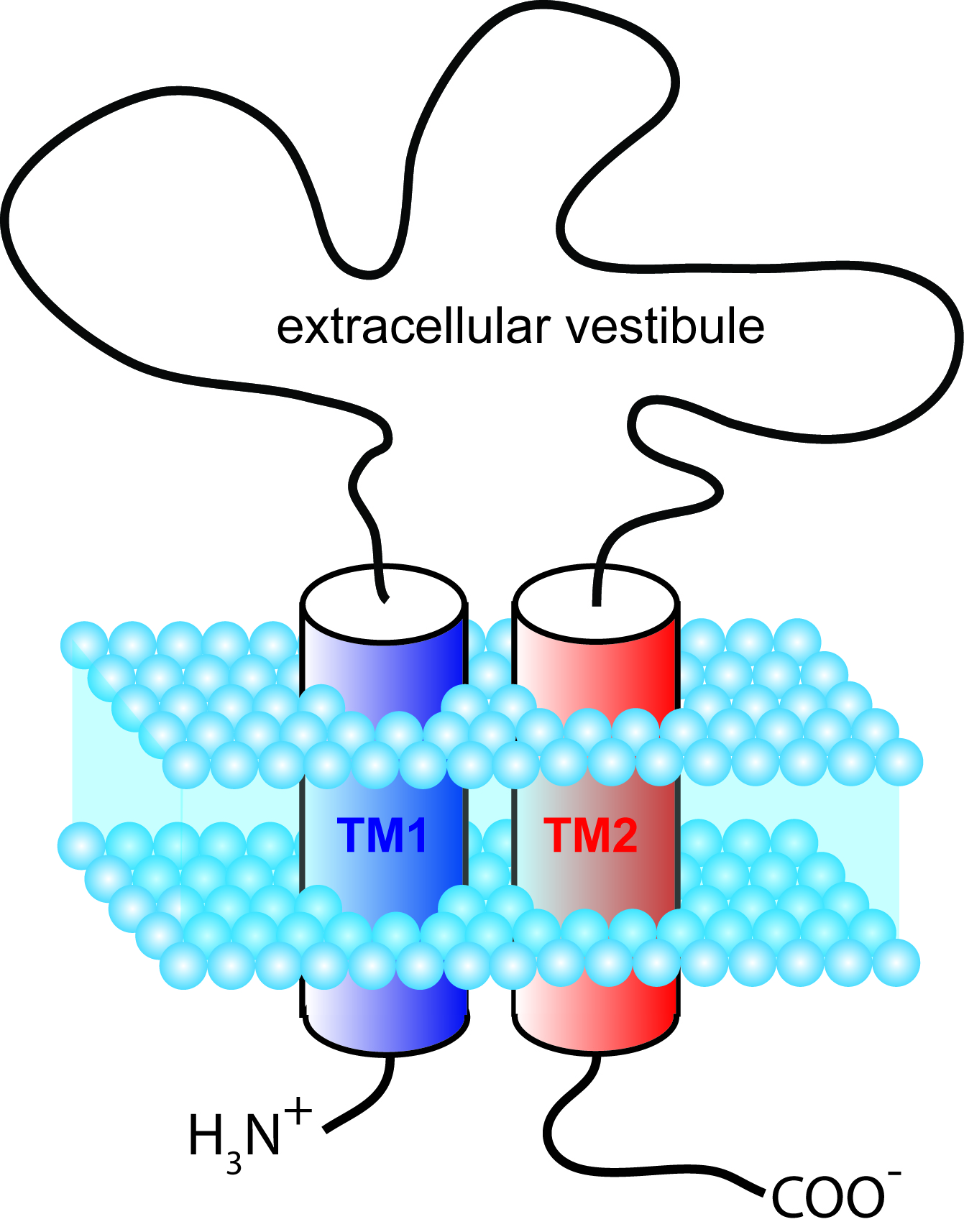
Representation of a typical P2X receptor subunit associated with the plasma membrane.

Various neuronal receptors present on SGCs have been named as participants in ATP-evoked pain signals, particularly the homomultimer P2X3 and the heteromultimer P2X2/3 purinoceptors. In general, the P2X family of receptors responds to neuronally released ATP. Each of the P2X subtypes are found in sensory neurons with the exception of the P2X7 receptor, which is selectively expressed by glial cells, including SGCs. The receptor has been implicated in the release of interleukin IL-1β from macrophages or microglia and astrocytes. The receptor likely has a part in the cascade of events that end with inflammation and neuropathic pain. It has been discovered that this receptor has an antagonist in the form of A-317491, which, when present, has the ability to reduce both the evoked and unprompted firing of various classes of spinal neurons, as well as to inhibit release of IL-1β. However, the outside influences of receptors P2X3 and P2Y1 are believed to complicate the interactions between P2X7 and its antagonist, making it a non-ideal target when using pharmacological strategy.

P2Y receptors are also found on both neurons and glial cells. Their role is less clear than that of the P2X receptors, but it has been noted they have several conflicting functions. In some cases, these receptors act as analgesics, as P2Y1 has the ability to inhibit the action of P2X3. In other cases, the receptors contribute to nociception through the modulation of the extracellular concentration of calcitonin gene related peptide (CGRP). These conflicting roles are being researched further so that they may serve as potential targets for the development of a variety of therapeutic drugs.

SGCs also express a specific type of channel, the Kir4.1 channel, which works to maintain the desired low extracellular K^{+} concentration in order to control hyperexcitability, which is known to cause migraines. Additionally, extracellular K^{+} concentration has been found to be controlled by guanine nucleoside guanosine (Guo). Guo, which may be involved in neuron-to-SGC communication and interaction in sensory ganglia, is also a potential target that could control the alterations of extracellular K^{+} concentration associated with chronic pain.

=== Herpes simplex ===
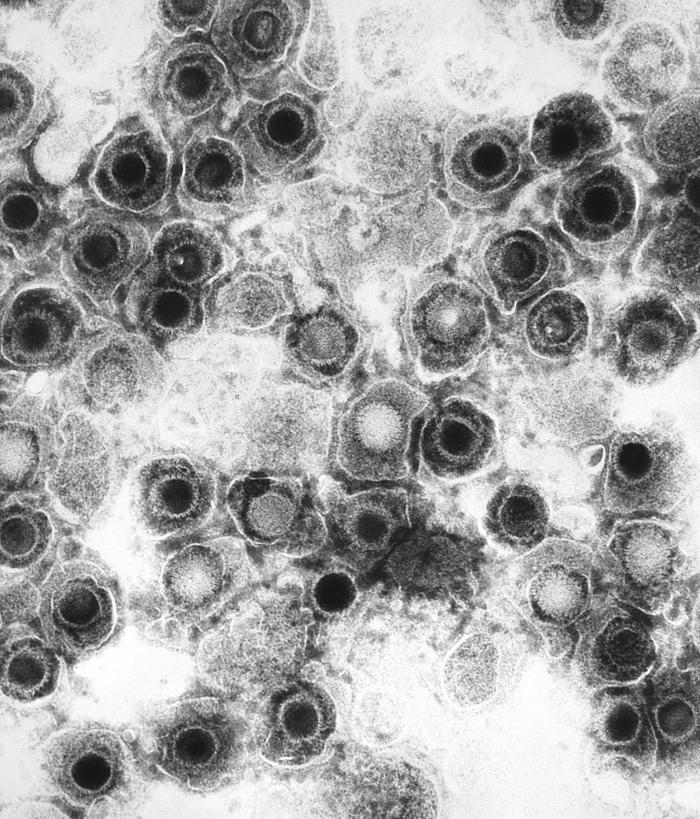
Herpes simplex virions.

Sensory ganglia have been associated with infections from viruses like herpes simplex, which can exist in a dormant state within the ganglia for decades after the primary infection. When the virus becomes reactivated, blisters on the skin and mucous membranes appear. During the latent stage of the virus, the viruses are rarely located in the SGCs within the sensory ganglia, but the SGCs may still play an important role within the disease. It has been proposed that SGCs act to create walls to prevent the spread of the virus from infected to uninfected neurons. If this wall of protection was to break down, then the infection could become more widespread. This property may be explained by looking at the location and arrangement of the SGCs, as they are centered on the neurons, allowing them to protect the neurons. It has also been proposed that SGCs may have a job in ridding the ganglia of the virus and in protecting and repairing the nervous system after the virus has left the dormant stage.

== Research directions ==
The majority of the information available on the subject of SGCs comes from research which was focused on the sensory neurons that the SGCs surround rather than the SGCs themselves. In the future, researchers plan to give more time and attention to the SGCs, which have many supportive and protective functions essential for life. Neurotransmitter and hormone receptors on SGCs in situ rather than in culture will likely be explored and definitively characterized. Changes in the receptors caused by various mutations and diseases will also be explored in order to determine the effect of these conditions. Additionally, the mechanisms behind neuronal-SGC communication is essentially unidentified, though it is likely that the various receptors both the neurons and SGCs have are used for chemical signaling, perhaps with P2Y. Ca^{2+} and NO and their effects must also be observed to gain further understanding of interactions between the two types of cells. Finally, the possibility of an influence of SGCs on synaptic transmission within autonomic ganglia provides another direction for future research.

== See also ==
List of distinct cell types in the adult human body
