= Superior cervical ganglion =

Largest of the cervical ganglia

Superior cervical ganglion (SCG)
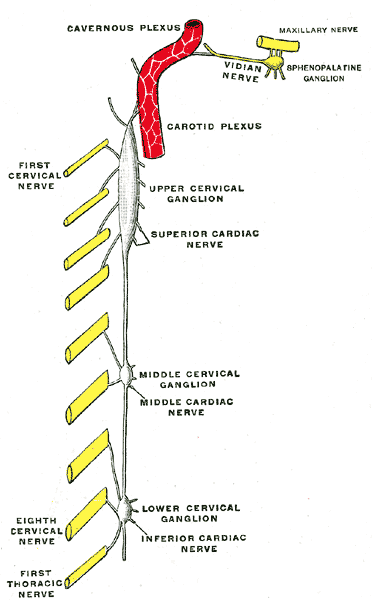
- Diagram of the cervical sympathetic. (Labeled as "Upper cervical ganglion")

Details

Identifiers
- Latin: ganglion cervicale superius
- MeSH: D017783
- TA98: A14.3.01.009
- TA2: 6608
- FMA: 6467

The superior cervical ganglion (SCG) is the upper-most and largest of the cervical sympathetic ganglia of the sympathetic trunk. It probably formed by the union of four sympathetic ganglia of the cervical spinal nerves C1–C4. It is the only ganglion of the sympathetic nervous system that innervates the head and neck. The SCG innervates numerous structures of the head and neck.

== Structure ==
The superior cervical ganglion is reddish-gray color, and usually shaped like a spindle with tapering ends. It measures about 3 cm in length. Sometimes the SCG is broad and flattened, and occasionally constricted at intervals.

It formed by the coalescence of four ganglia, corresponding to the four upper-most cervical nerves C1–C4. The bodies of its preganglionic sympathetic afferent neurons are located in the lateral horn of the spinal cord. Their axons enter the SCG to synapse with postganglionic neurons whose axons then exit the rostral end of the SCG and proceed to innervate their target organs in the head.

The SCG contributes to the formation of the cervical plexus. The cervical plexus is formed from a unification of the anterior divisions of the upper four cervical nerves. Each receives a gray ramus communicans from the superior cervical ganglion.

=== Relations ===
The SCG is located anterior to the second and third cervical vertebrae. It is situated posterior to the carotid sheath. It is situated anterior to the longus capitis muscle.

=== Afferents and efferents ===
The SCG receives pre-ganglionic sympathetic afferents from the ciliospinal center which synapse in the ganglion. Post-ganglionic efferents then leave the SCG and join the internal carotid nerve plexus of the internal carotid artery, accompanying first this artery and subsequently its branches to reach the orbit and ultimately innervate the dilator pupillae muscle to mediate pupillary dilatation.

== Cell biology ==
The superior cervical ganglion contains some 1 million nerve cell bodies. There are a number of neuron types in the SCG ranging from low threshold to high threshold neurons. The neurons with a low threshold have a faster action potential firing rate, while the high threshold neurons have a slow firing rate. Another distinction between SCG neuron types is made via immunostaining. Immunostaining allows the classification of SCG neurons as either positive or negative for neuropeptide Y (NPY), which is found in a subgroup of high-threshold neurons. Low threshold, NPY-negative neurons are secretomotor neurons, innervating salivary glands. High threshold, NPY-negative neurons are vasomotor neurons, innervating blood vessels. High threshold, NPY-positive neurons are vasoconstrictor neurons, which innervate the iris and pineal gland.

== Function ==
The SCG provides sympathetic innervation to structures within the head, including the pineal gland, the blood vessels in the cranial muscles and the brain, the choroid plexus, the eyes, the lacrimal glands, the carotid body, the salivary glands, and thyroid gland.

The postganglionic axons of the SCG form the internal carotid plexus. The internal carotid plexus carries the postganglionic axons of the SCG to the eye, lacrimal gland, mucous membranes of the mouth, nose, and pharynx, and numerous blood vessels in the head.

=== Pineal gland ===
The postganglionic axons of the SCG innervate the pineal gland and are involved in circadian rhythm. This connection regulates the production of the hormone melatonin, which regulates sleep and wake cycles, however the influence of SCG neuron innervation of the pineal gland is not fully understood.

=== The eye ===
The SCG provides sympathetic innervation to the eye and lacrimal gland, regulating vasoconstriction in the iris and sclera, pupillary dilation, widening of the palpebral fissure, and the reduced production of tears.

=== Blood vessels of the skin ===
The SCG innervates blood vessels of the skin mediates vasoconstriction, regulating body heat loss.

=== Vestibular system ===
The SCG is connected with vestibular structures, including the neuroepithelium of the semicircular canals and otolith organs, providing a conceivable substrate for modulation of vestibulo-sympathetic reflexes.

== Clinical significance ==
=== Horner's syndrome ===
Horner's syndrome is a disorder resulting from damage to the sympathetic autonomic nervous pathway in the head. Damage to the SCG, part of this system, often results in Horner's syndrome. Damage to the C1-C3 regions of the spinal cord is responsible for drooping of the eyelids (ptosis), constriction of the pupil (miosis), and sinking of the eyeball (apparent Enophthalmos; not truly sunken, just appears so because of the drooping eyelid). Lesion or significant damage to the SCG results in a third order neuron disorder (see Horner's Syndrome: Pathophysiology).

=== Familial dysautonomia ===
Familial dysautonomia is a genetic disorder characterized by abnormalities of sensory and sympathetic neurons. The SCG is significantly affected by this loss of neurons and may be responsible for some of the resulting symptoms. In post-mortem studies the SCG is, on average, one-third of normal size and has only 12 percent of the normal number of neurons. Defects in the genetic coding for NGF, which result in less functional, abnormally structured NGF, may be the molecular cause of familial dysautonomia. NGF is necessary for survival of some neurons so loss of NGF function could be the cause for neuronal death in the SCG.

== History ==
=== Reinnervation ===
In the late 19th century, John Langley discovered that the superior cervical ganglion is topographically organized. When certain areas of the superior cervical ganglion were stimulated, a reflex occurred in specified regions of the head. His findings showed that preganglionic neurons innervate specific postganglionic neurons. In his further studies of the superior cervical ganglion, Langley discovered that the superior cervical ganglion is regenerative. Langley severed the SCG above the T1 portion, causing a loss of reflexes. When left to their own accord, the fibers reinnervated the SCG and the initial autonomic reflexes were recovered, though there was limited recovery of pineal gland function. When Langley severed the connections between the SCG and the T1–T5 region of the spinal cord and replaced the SCG with a different one, the SCG was still innervated the same portion of the spinal cord as before. When he replaced the SCG with a T5 ganglion, the ganglion tended to be innervated by the posterior portion of the spinal cord (T4–T8). The replacement of the original SCG with either a different one or a T5 ganglion supported Langley's theory of topographic specificity of the SCG.

=== Research ===
Ganglia of the peripheral autonomic nervous system are commonly used to study synaptic connections. These ganglia are studied as synaptic connections show many similarities to the central nervous system (CNS) and are also relatively accessible. They are easier to study than the CNS since they have the ability to regrow, which neurons in the CNS do not have. The SCG is frequently used in these studies being one of the larger ganglia. Today, neuroscientists are studying topics on the SCG such as survival and neurite outgrowth of SCG neurons, neuroendocrine aspects of the SCG, and structure and pathways of the SCG. These studies are usually performed on rats, guinea-pigs, and rabbits.

=== Historical contributions ===
- E. Rubin studied the development of the SCG in fetal rats. Research on the development of nerves in the SCG has implications for the general development of the nervous system.
- The effects of age on dendritic arborisation of sympathetic neurons has been studied in the SCG of rats. Findings have shown that there is significant dendritic growth in the SCG of young rats but none in aged rats. In aged rats, it was found, that there was a reduction in the number of dendrites.
- SCG cells were used to study nerve growth factor (NGF) and its ability to direct growth of neurons. Results showed that NGF did have this directing, or tropic, effect on neurons, guiding the direction of their growth.

== Additional images ==
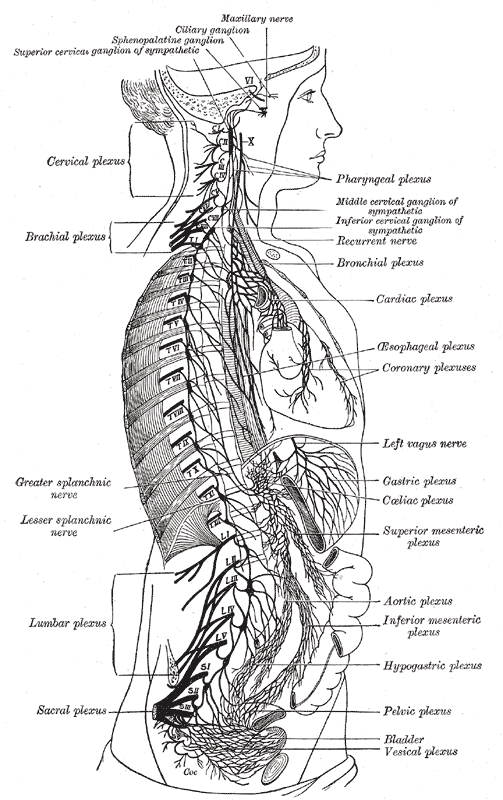
The right sympathetic chain and its connections with the thoracic, abdominal, and pelvic plexuses.

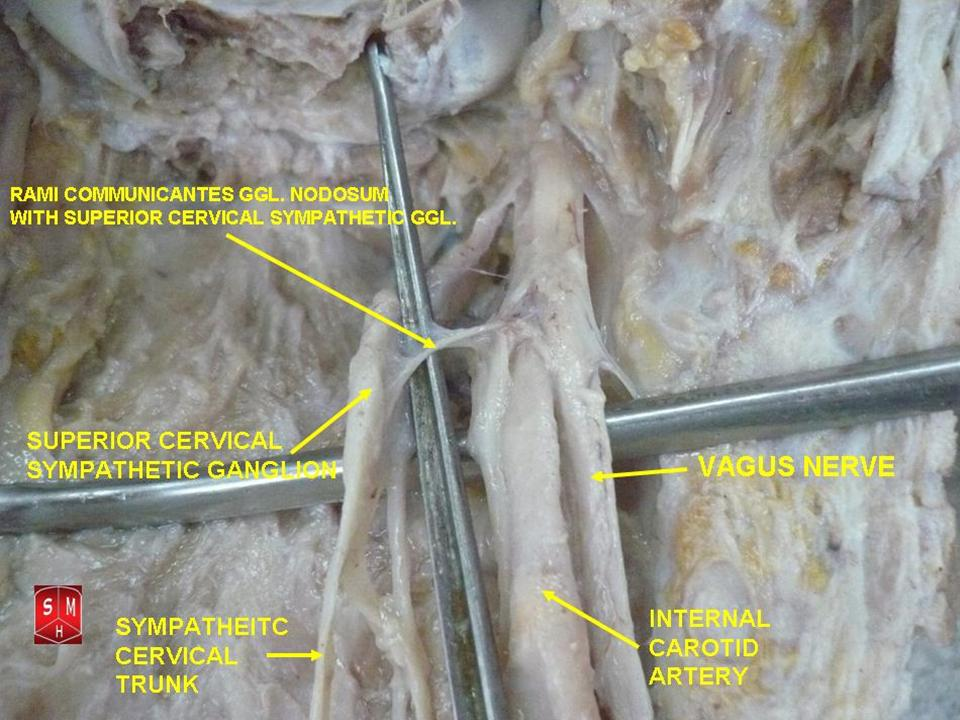
Superior cervical ganglion

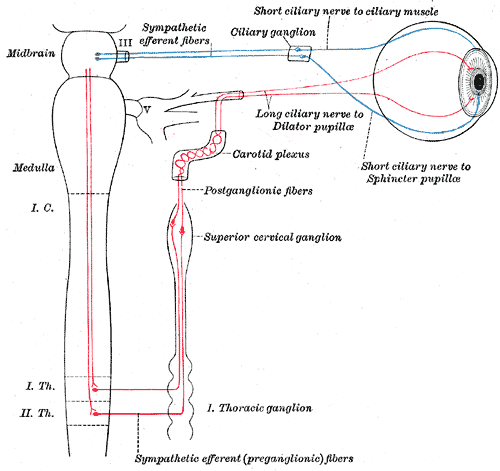
Sympathetic connections of the ciliary and superior cervical ganglia.

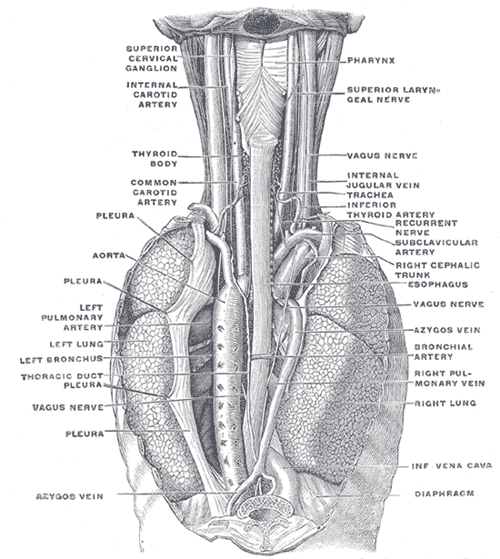
The position and relation of the esophagus in the cervical region and in the posterior mediastinum. Seen from behind.

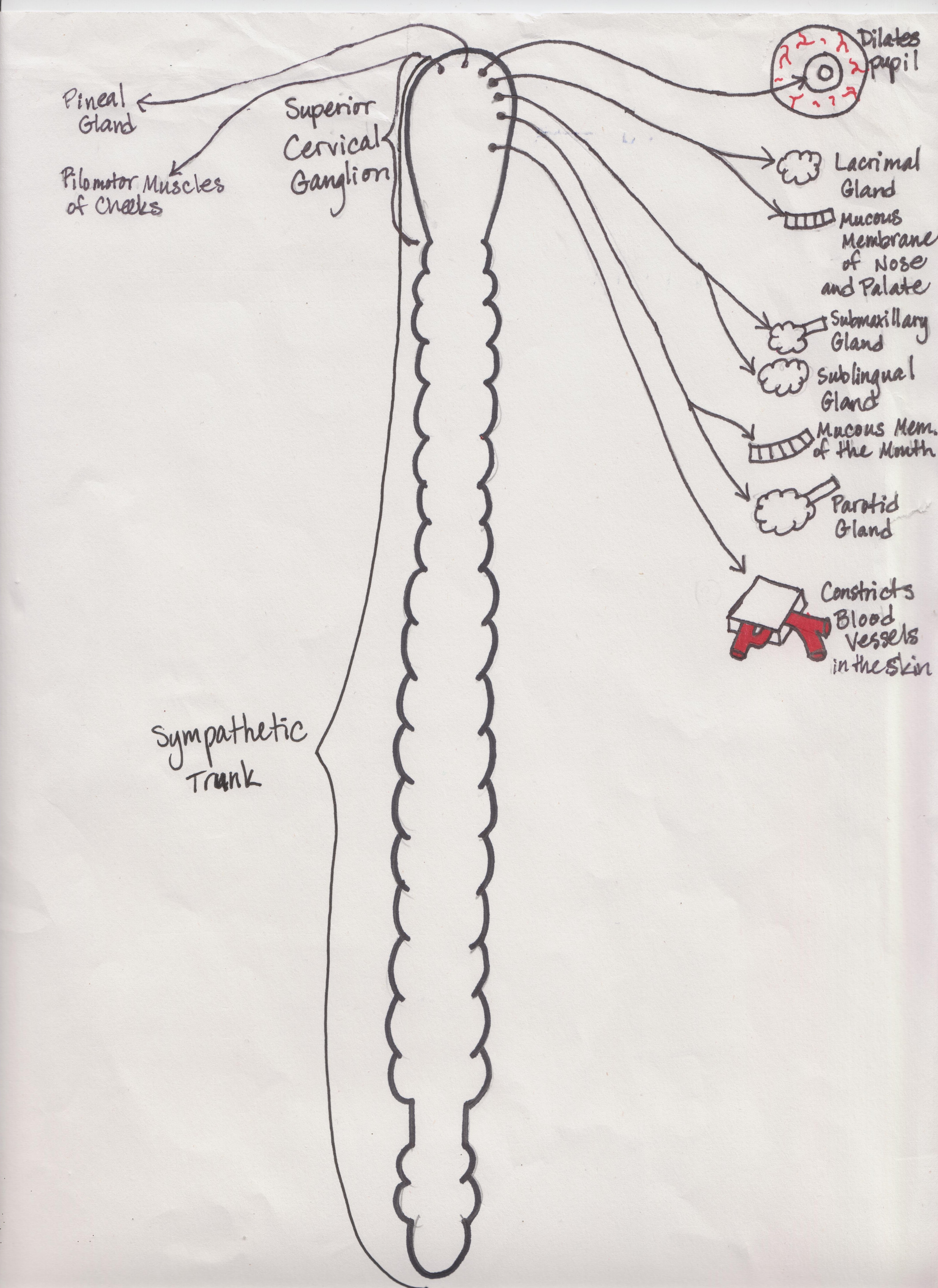
The Sympathetic Trunk and SCG innervation of target organs in the head.
