= Gray ramus communicans =

Details

Identifiers
- Latin: r. communicans griseus
- TA98: A14.3.01.006
- TA2: 6149
- FMA: 5876

Each spinal nerve receives a branch called a gray ramus communicans (pl.: rami communicantes) from the adjacent paravertebral ganglion of the sympathetic trunk. The gray rami communicantes contain postganglionic nerve fibers of the sympathetic nervous system and are composed of largely unmyelinated neurons. This is in contrast to the white rami communicantes, in which heavily myelinated neurons give the rami their white appearance.

== Function ==
Preganglionic sympathetic fibers from the intermediolateral nucleus in the lateral grey column of the spinal cord are carried in the white ramus communicans to the paravertebral ganglia of the sympathetic trunk. Once the preganglionic nerve has traversed a white ramus communicans, it can do one of three things.

- The preganglionic neuron can synapse with a postganglionic sympathetic neuron in the sympathetic paravertebral ganglion at that level. From here, the postganglionic sympathetic neuron can travel back out the grey ramus communicans of that level to the mixed spinal nerve and onto the effector organ.
- The preganglionic neuron can travel superiorly or inferiorly to a sympathetic paravertebral ganglion of a higher or lower level where it can synapse with a postganglionic sympathetic neuron. From here, the postganglionic sympathetic neuron can travel back out the grey ramus communicans of that level to the mixed spinal nerve and on to an effector organ.
- The preganglionic neuron can pass through the paravertebral ganglion without synapsing, and therefore continue as a preganglionic nerve fiber (Splanchnic nerves) until it reaches a distant collateral ganglion anterior to the vertebral column (Prevertebral ganglia). Once inside the prevertebral ganglia, the individual neurons comprising the nerve synapse with their postganglionic neuron. The postganglionic nerve then proceeds to innervate its targets (pelvic visceral organs) It will generally be responsible for the innervation of the pelvic viscera.

Ganglionic influence can be specifically targeted to end organs as well as becoming part of a summating systemic response. If the response is the whole body response, as in sympathetic fight or flight, the signals are distributed to other spinal nerves by way of gray rami communicantes which serve as conduits between the spinal nerves.

=== Specific Functions in the ANS ===
Some cervical ganglia and thoracic ganglia send gray rami communicantes directly to the heart.
Thoracic ganglia send grey rami communicantes to their adjacent body wall. They supply blood vessels, sweat glands, and arrectores pilorum muscles.
Lumbar ganglia have grey rami communicantes that rejoin the appropriate spinal nerves to supply the abdominal wall and lower limbs.
The pelvic ganglia form grey rami communicantes whose lateral (postganglionic) branches supply the pelvic wall and lower limb.

== Additional images ==
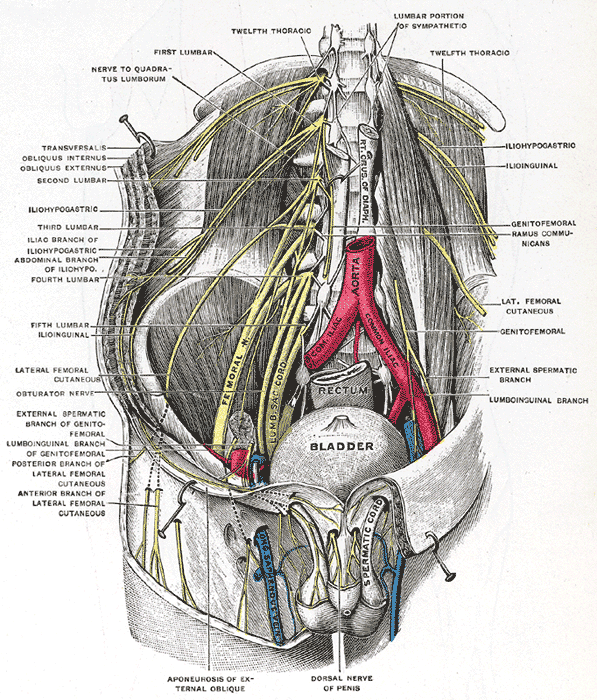
Deep and superficial dissection of the lumbar plexus.

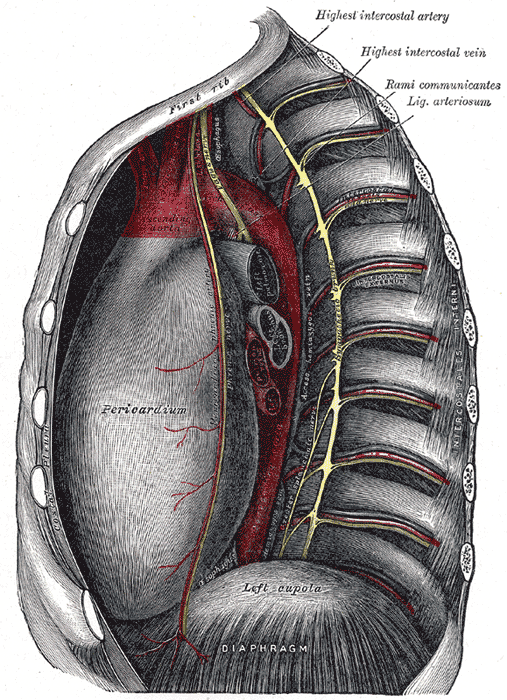
Thoracic portion of the sympathetic trunk.
