= Autonomic dysreflexia =

Medical condition

- Other names: Autonomic hyperreflexia
- Specialty: Physical medicine and rehabilitation, Neurology
- Causes: Bladder distension, urinary tract infection, constipation, skin damage, fractures, etc.
- Prevention: Educate the patient and caregivers about common triggers
- Treatment: Removal of the noxious stimuli
- Prognosis: Generally good prognosis with low levels of mortality

Autonomic dysreflexia (AD) is a life-threatening medical emergency characterized by hypertension and cardiac arrhythmias. This condition is sometimes referred to as autonomic hyperreflexia. Most cases of AD occur in individuals with spinal cord injuries. Lesions at or above the T6 spinal cord level are more frequently reported, although there are reports of AD in patients with lesions as low as T10. Guillain–Barré syndrome may also cause autonomic dysreflexia.

Hypertension in AD may result in mild symptoms, such as sweating above the lesion level, goosebumps, blurred vision, or headache. Severe symptoms may result in life-threatening complications including seizure, intracranial bleeds (stroke), myocardial infarction, and retinal detachment.

Both noxious and non-noxious stimuli can trigger AD. The result is stimulation and hyperactivity of the sympathetic nervous system. The noxious stimuli activate a sympathetic surge that travels through intact peripheral nerves, resulting in systemic vasoconstriction below the level of the spinal cord lesion. The peripheral arterial vasoconstriction and hypertension activates the baroreceptors, resulting in a parasympathetic surge. This surge originates in the central nervous system to inhibit the sympathetic outflow. However, the parasympathetic signal is unable to transmit below the level of the spinal cord lesion to reduce elevated blood pressure. This can result in bradycardia, tachycardia, vasodilation, flushing, pupillary constriction and nasal stuffiness above the spinal lesion. Piloerection and pale, cool skin occur below the lesion due to the prevailing sympathetic outflow.

The most common causes include bladder or bowel over-distension from urinary retention and fecal compaction. Other causes include pressure sores, extreme temperatures, fractures, undetected painful stimuli (such as a pebble in a shoe), startle reflex, gastric distension, sexual activity, and extreme spinal cord pain.

Treating AD immediately involves removing or correcting the noxious stimuli. This entails sitting the patient upright, removing any constrictive clothing (including abdominal binders and support stockings), and rechecking blood pressure often. The inciting issue may require urinary catheterization or bowel disimpaction. If systolic blood pressure remains elevated (over 150 mm Hg) after these steps, fast-acting short-duration antihypertensives are considered, while other inciting causes must be investigated for the symptoms to resolve.

Educating the patient, family, and caregivers about the avoidance of triggers and the cause, if known, is important in the prevention of AD. Since bladder and bowel are common causes, routine bladder and bowel programs and urological follow-up may help reduce the frequency and severity of attacks. These follow-ups may include cystoscopy/urodynamic studies.

Prognosis of AD is generally good and mortality is rare, given that the trigger is identified and managed.

== Signs and symptoms ==
This condition is distinct and usually episodic. An elevation of 20 mm Hg over baseline systolic blood pressure, with a potential source below the neurological level of injury, meets the current definition of dysreflexia.

Common presenting symptoms include:

- headache
- diaphoresis
- increased blood pressure
- facial erythema
- goosebumps
- nasal stuffiness
- a "feeling of doom" or apprehension
- blurred vision.

=== Complications ===
Autonomic dysreflexia can become chronic and recurrent. This often occurs in response to longstanding medical problems like soft tissue pressure injuries or hemorrhoids.

Complications of severe acute hypertension can include seizures, pulmonary edema, myocardial infarction, or cerebral hemorrhage. Other organs that may be affected include the kidneys and retinas of the eyes. Long-term therapy to decrease blood pressure may include alpha blockers or calcium channel blockers.

== Causes ==
The first episode of autonomic dysreflexia may occur weeks to years after the spinal cord injury takes place. It may take place anytime after reflexes have returned following spinal shock. Most people at risk develop their first episode within the first year after the injury.

There are many possible triggers of AD in patients who have had spinal cord injuries. The most common causative factor is bladder distention. Other causes include urinary tract infections, urinary retention, blocked catheters, constipation, hemorrhoids or fissures, skin damage, fractures, and sexual intercourse. Not all noxious stimuli will cause AD. Some otherwise severe noxious stimuli, e.g. broken bones, may not result in AD, and may in fact even go unnoticed. In the absence of clear triggering factors, recurrent episodes of AD can be important signs that there is an underlying pathology in a patient that has not yet been discovered.

== Mechanism ==
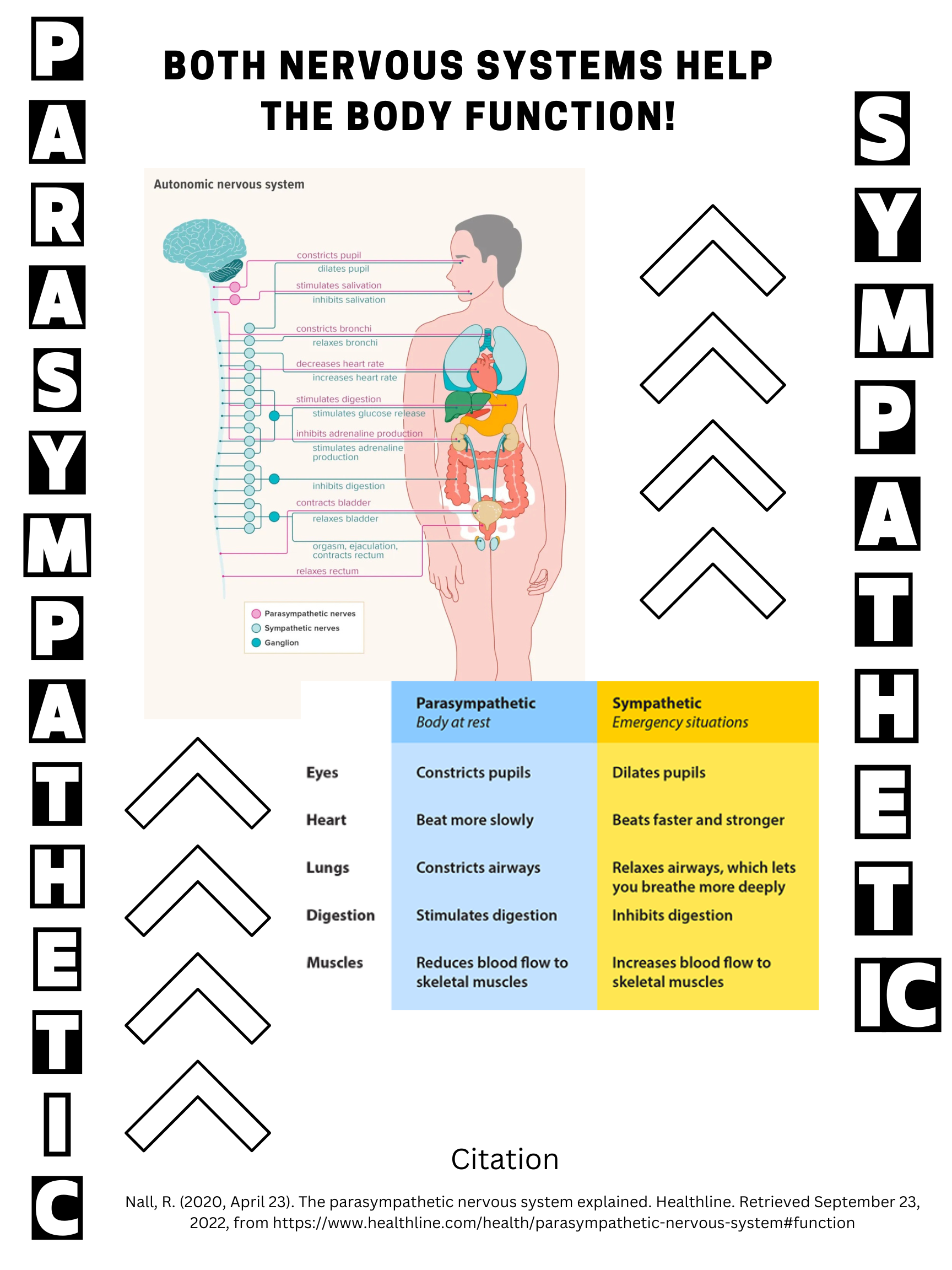
Clinical signs of activation of the sympathetic and parasympathetic nervous systems

The autonomic nervous system comprises the sympathetic, parasympathetic, and enteric nervous systems. The mechanism of autonomic dysreflexia has to do with the relationship of the sympathetic and parasympathetic systems.

Supraspinal vasomotor neurons send projections to the intermediolateral cell column, which is composed of sympathetic preganglionic neurons (SPN) through the T1-L2 segments of the spinal cord. The supraspinal neurons act on the SPN and its tonic firing by modulating its action on the peripheral sympathetic chain ganglia and the adrenal medulla. The sympathetic ganglia act directly on the blood vessels they innervate throughout the body. This controls vessel diameter and resistance. The adrenal medulla indirectly controls the same action through the release of epinephrine and norepinephrine.

In a patient with a spinal cord lesion, the descending autonomic pathways that are responsible for the supraspinal communication with the SPN are interrupted. This results in decreased sympathetic outflow below the level of the injury. In this circumstance, the SPN is controlled only by spinal influences.

After a spinal injury, the decreased sympathetic outflow causes reduced blood pressure and sympathetic reflex. Eventually, synaptic reorganization and plasticity of the SPN develops into an overly sensitive state. Because of this, there is abnormal reflex activation of SPN due to afferent stimuli. Most commonly, bowel or bladder distension.

Reflex activation then results in systemic vasoconstriction below the spinal cord disruption. This peripheral arterial vasoconstriction and hypertension activates the baroreceptors. There is a resultant parasympathetic surge originating in the central nervous system which inhibits the sympathetic outflow. This parasympathetic signal is unable to transmit below the level of the spinal cord lesion and there is a heightened sympathetic response. This results in vasodilation, flushing, pupillary constriction and nasal stuffiness above the spinal lesion. Below the lesion, piloerection, paleness, and cool skin occur due to the prevailing sympathetic outflow. This issue is much more prominent for lesions at or above the T6 level. This is because the splanchnic nerves emerge from the T5 level and below.

== Diagnosis ==
Autonomic dysreflexia is diagnosed by documenting an increase in systolic blood pressure greater than 20 to 30 mmHg. The associated symptoms vary from life-threatening to asymptomatic.

An essential step to diagnosing AD is careful monitoring of blood pressure and other vital sign changes. Having knowledge of the patient's baseline blood pressure can be helpful in diagnosing AD. Especially in cases of patients with baseline hypotension since the condition may not be recognized unless compared with their baseline levels.

Apart from the increased blood pressure, additional symptoms help differentiate AD from other conditions. These include sweating, spasms, erythema (more likely in upper extremities), headaches, and blurred vision. Older patients with very incomplete spinal cord injuries and systolic hypertension may be experiencing essential hypertension, not autonomic dysreflexia, if they lack additional symptoms.

=== Differential Diagnoses ===
Other diagnoses that should be considered due to similar presentation include:

- Intracranial hemorrhage
- Ischemic stroke
- Hyperthyroidism
- Anxiety
- Essential hypertension
- Drug overdose

== Treatment ==
Initial management of autonomic dysreflexia includes measuring and monitoring blood pressure and sitting the patient upright to attempt to lower their blood pressure. It is also important to search for and correct the triggering stimuli. Tight clothing and pressure stockings should be removed. Catheterization of the bladder should be performed as well as evaluation for possible urinary tract infection (UTI). Indwelling catheters should be checked for obstruction. Relief of a blocked urinary catheter tube may resolve the problem. A rectal examination can be performed to clear the rectum of any possible stool impaction. If the noxious stimuli cannot be identified or the systolic blood pressure remains above 150 mmHg, then pharmacologic treatment may be needed. In this situation, the aim is to decrease the elevated intracranial pressure until further studies can identify the cause.

Pharmacologic treatment will include antihypertensive medications. Options include sublingual or topical nitrates as well as oral hydralazine or clonidine. Ganglionic blockers can also be used to control sympathetic nervous system outflow. Epidural anesthesia has been demonstrated to be effective in reducing AD in women in labor. However, there is less evidence for its use in reducing AD during general surgical procedures.

If the episode of AD is triggered by bowel or bladder irritants, topical analgesics such as lidocaine and bupivacaine are commonly used. Yet, their effectiveness in reducing AD remains inconclusive. Because bladder distension is a common trigger of AD, botulinum toxin used to treat bladder dysfunction in SCI patients may be effective in reducing attacks. Prophylactic use of medications has also been reported to prevent attacks. Some examples include nifedipine, prazosin, and terazosin.

Patients with AD should have a card or file about their medical history in case they have an episode in public. This will help the individuals responding to the episode manage the situation by looking for common triggers. Patients with history of AD should also carry their medications for easy access in emergency scenarios.

== Prognosis ==
The prognosis of autonomic dysreflexia is generally good, given that the trigger is identified and managed. Attacks can be prevented by recognizing and avoiding triggering stimuli.

Mortality is rare with AD, but morbidities such as stroke, retinal hemorrhage, and pulmonary edema if left untreated can be quite severe. The cause of autonomic dysreflexia itself can be life-threatening. There must be proper investigation and appropriate treatment of the inciting cause to prevent unnecessary morbidity and mortality.

== Research directions ==
Most future work on the topic of autonomic dysreflexia is directed at earlier detection and intervention. Overall, the goal of these research projects involves minimizing complications that result from late detection of autonomic dysreflexia. Some research is aimed at investigating the use of non-invasive sensors to track nerve activity to detect signs of AD. Other work has begun to look at the use of AI for this role, although it has been limited to rat models. Results from a study showed that AI can serve as another non-invasive tool in combination with sensors that track nerve activity. Future work of studies such as these include using more sensors to track other variables for increasingly accurate results.

Other work revolves around increasing the understanding of the mechanism behind AD. While it is understood that spinal cord injury results in inhibited parasympathetic surges and a heightened sympathetic response that can lead to AD, other details are yet to be defined. It is also understood that the renin-angiotensin system (RAS) plays a significant role in cardiovascular function in addition to the autonomic nervous system (ANS), which includes the sympathetic and parasympathetic systems. What remains to be studied is the degree to which a spinal cord injury affects the relationship between RAS and ANS. It also remains to be determined whether targeting the RAS system can help manage symptoms of AD.
