= Lateral grey column =

One of three columns of grey matter in the spinal cord

Lateral grey column (lateral horn)
- Cross-Section of the Spinal Cord

Details

Identifiers
- Latin: cornu laterale medullae spinalis
- MeSH: D066152
- TA98: A14.1.02.132; A14.1.02.022
- TA2: 6077
- FMA: 256536

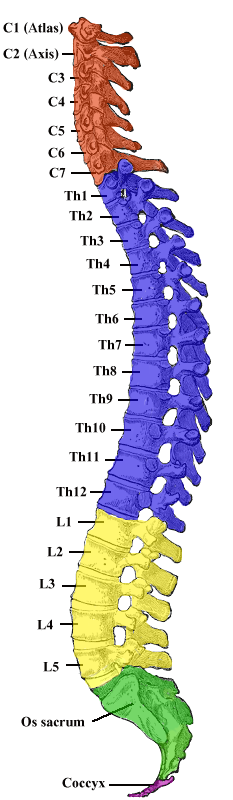
The four main divisions of the spinal column, from top to bottom: cervical, thoracic, lumbar, and sacral

The lateral grey column (lateral column, lateral cornu, lateral horn of spinal cord, intermediolateral column) is one of the three grey columns of the spinal cord (which give the shape of a butterfly); the others being the anterior and posterior grey columns. The lateral grey column is primarily involved with activity in the sympathetic division of the autonomic motor system. It projects to the side as a triangular field in the thoracic and upper lumbar regions (specifically T1-L2) of the postero-lateral part of the anterior grey column.

== Background information ==
=== Nervous system ===
The nervous system is the system of neurons, or nerve cells that relay electrical signals through the brain and body. A nerve cell receives signals from other nerve cells through tree-branch-like extensions called dendrites and passes signals through a long extension called an axon (or nerve fiber). Synapses are places where one cell's axon passes information to another cell's dendrite by sending chemicals called neurotransmitters across a small gap called a synaptic cleft. Synapses occur in various locations, including ganglia (singular: ganglion), which are masses of nerve cell bodies. Preganglionic nerve cells in the sympathetic nervous system (all of which come from the lateral grey column), use the neurotransmitter acetylcholine, while postganglionic sympathetic nerve cells use norepinephrine. Grey matter in the brain and spinal cord is any accumulation of cell bodies and neuropil (neuropil is tissue rich in nerve cell bodies and dendrites). White matter consists of nerve tracts (groups of axons) and commissures (tracts that cross the brain's midline).

=== Sympathetic nervous system ===
The nervous system is divided into the central nervous system (brain and spinal cord) and the peripheral nervous system (everything else). The peripheral nervous system is divided into the somatic nervous system (voluntary processes) and the autonomic nervous system (involuntary processes). The autonomic nervous system is divided into the parasympathetic nervous system (normal functioning) and the sympathetic nervous system (emergency functioning). The lateral grey column mediates the functions of the sympathetic nervous system.

=== Spinal cord ===
The spinal cord is divided into 31 segments, located between the vertebrae. Each segment is defined by a posterior root entering it and an anterior root exiting it. Each of these roots is the end of a spinal nerve connecting the spinal cord to the body. The vertebral column is divided into four groups of vertebrae: (from top to bottom) cervical, thoracic, lumbar, and sacral.

== Structure ==
The lateral grey column is present at 17 levels of the spinal cord, specifically through levels T1-L2 (sympathetic outflow) as well as through levels S2-S4 (parasympathetic outflow). Both these segments are located within the first thoracic vertebra to the first or second lumbar vertebra as the spinal cord ends here and the nerves form the cauda equina.

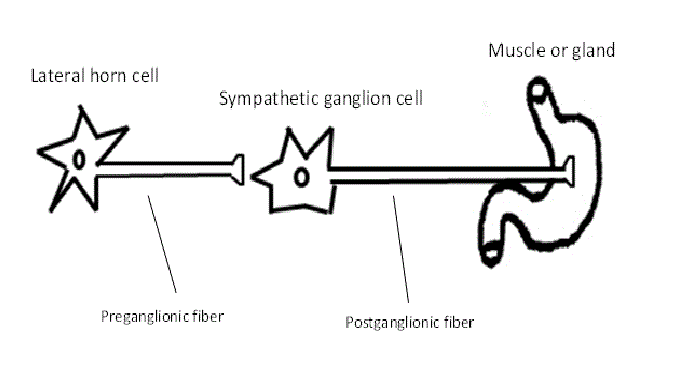
Pathway from the lateral grey column to target tissue

The lateral grey column is composed of sympathetic preganglionic visceral motor neurons which are part of the autonomic nervous system. An in-depth study of the lateral grey columns in the thoracic region of rats revealed two types of cells. One cell type was characterized by many mitochondria, an indented nucleus, and a long endoplasmic reticulum, while the other cell type had an increased cytoplasmic density and a short endoplasmic reticulum. Lateral column axon terminals were found to contain noradrenaline storage granules and could be divided into four types. Type one terminals contained a few large and many small granular vesicles, and type two terminals had many large vesicles and barely noticeable granules. Type three terminals contained small, spherical vesicles and no granules, and type four were the rarest terminals that had flattened vesicles with small and large granules.

The cells of the intermediolateral cell column are fusiform or star-shaped, and of a medium size. The intermediolateral cell column exists at vertebral levels T1 - L2 and mediates the entire sympathetic innervation of the body. In the upper part of the cervical region and lower part of the medulla oblongata, as well as in the third and fourth sacral vertebrae, this column is again differentiated.

== Functions ==
The lateral grey column's connections mediate the functions of the sympathetic nervous system (SNS), which changes cardiac, pulmonary, hepatic (liver), and gastrointestinal activities to prepare the body for emergency situations (although the sympathetic system is always active to some extent, including in the absence of a stressful environment, to maintain the appropriate level of sympathetic function). When the brain responds to potential threats by sending signals to lateral grey column cells, the lateral column passes on the signals to initiate a variety of physiological changes that prepare the body for a “fight-or-flight” response. Hairs stand up to conserve heat. The gut relaxes and digestion slows so that more energy can be directed toward dealing with the threatening situation. The adrenal medulla is activated and releases epinephrine (adrenaline) into the bloodstream, where it mediates many changes, such as the preparation of muscles for emergency activity. A variety of smooth muscles relax; for example, the muscles wrapped around the bronchioles of the lungs relax, allowing more oxygen to enter the bloodstream. Heart rate increases to ensure all cells are supplied quickly with the substances they need. The liver produces glucose (sugar) to fuel the muscles. Blood vessels contract (vasoconstriction), which reduces bleeding and conserves body heat (the exception is blood vessels fueling large muscles that would be used in running or fighting). The pupils dilate, improving vision. Perspiration increases in certain areas of the body (the purpose of this is not yet fully understood, but there is some evidence that the odor produced by this sweat serves as a signal to other individuals).

=== Sympathetic ===
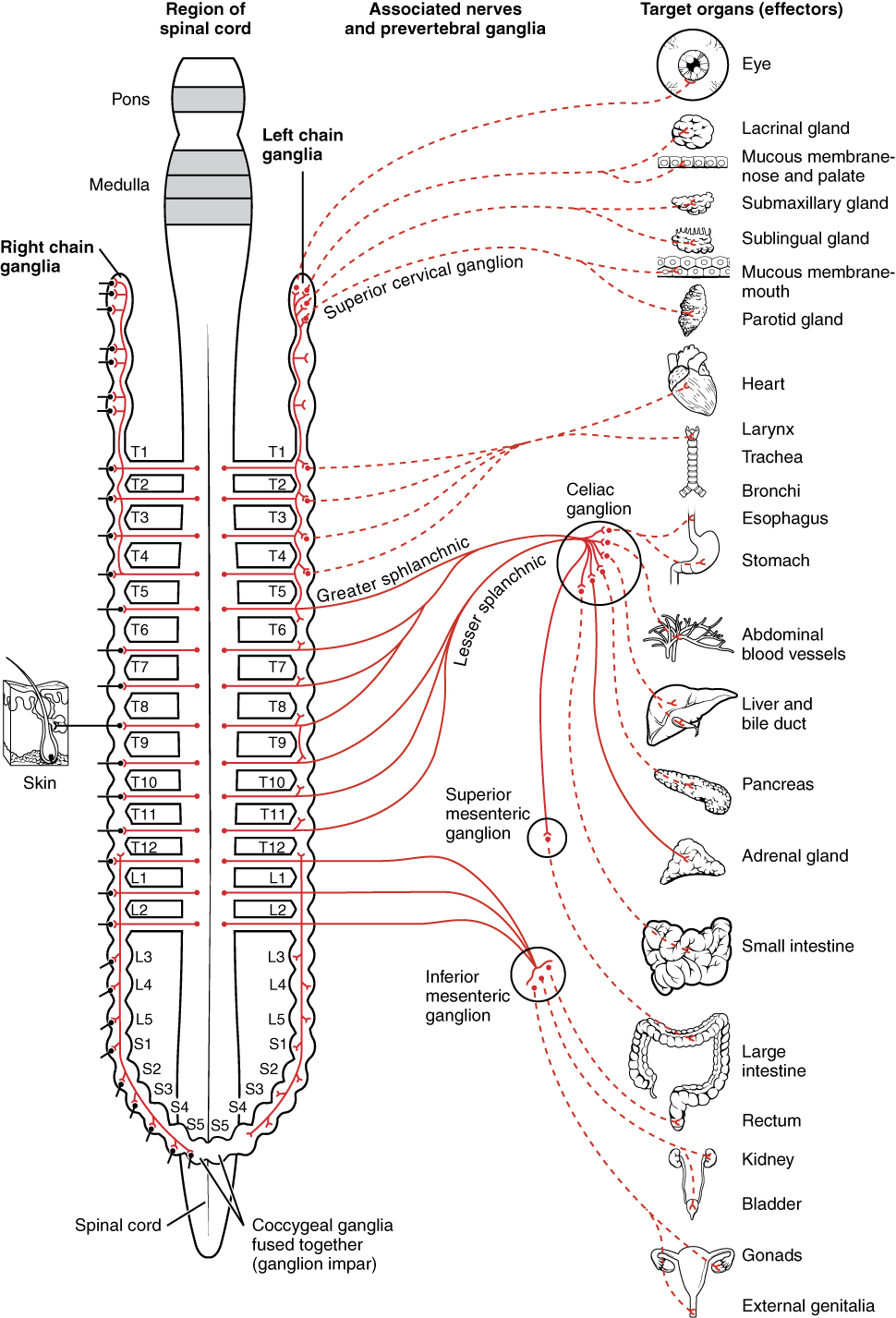
Sympathetic nervous system

The lateral grey column plays an important role in the sympathetic division of the visceral (autonomic) motor system. Neuron cell bodies in the lateral column send their axons to synapse on sympathetic ganglia that innervate autonomic and pelvic organs; in fact, all preganglionic neurons in the sympathetic nervous system originate in the lateral grey column. Neurons in the upper and middle thoracic segments control sympathetic activity in organs in the head and thorax, while neurons in the lower thoracic and upper lumbar segments control abdominal and pelvic organs and targets in the lower extremities.

Slightly myelinated preganglionic nerve fibers (aka visceral efferent fibers) leave the lateral grey column through the ventral roots and promptly form fourteen aggregates called white rami communicantes, also known as white communicating rami, which eventually enter the sympathetic trunk, a structure next to the vertebral column that consists of paired chains of sympathetic ganglia connected by nerve fibers.

Most often, the fibers from the lateral grey column will travel along the sympathetic trunk until they synapse on one of the trunk's ganglia, which then passes on the information via postganglionic fibers in a gray ramus communicans. 31 pairs of gray rami communicantes exit the sympathetic trunk to join the 31 pairs of spinal nerves and travel to targets such as sweat glands, hair follicles, and blood vessels. Some fibers, such as those in the cardiac nerves that innervate the heart, reach the target organ directly, without first joining a gray ramus communicans.

Other fibers from lateral grey column neurons pass through the sympathetic trunk without synapsing there. The greater splanchnic nerve leaves the vertebral levels T5-T9 and synapses in the abdomen in the celiac ganglia, which innervates the celiac artery (splanchnic nerves are the nerves that innervate thoracic and abdominal viscera). The lesser splanchnic nerve travels from the vertebral levels T10-T11 to the abdomen's superior mesenteric ganglia, which innervates the superior mesenteric artery, and to the aorticorenal ganglion. The least, or lowest, splanchnic nerve connects the T12 level to the renal plexus. The lumbar splanchnic nerves from the upper two lumbar segments synapse in the abdomen on the inferior mesenteric ganglia, associated with the inferior mesenteric artery. In addition, some thoracic fibers in the splanchnic nerves innervate the adrenal medulla, a ganglion in the abdomen that mediates the sympathetic response to stress.

Axons from the lateral grey column release acetylcholine at their synapses. This can excite or inhibit the postsynaptic cell, depending on the type of acetylcholine receptor in its membrane. Postganglionic cells (that is, nerve cells innervated in ganglia by lateral column neurons) typically release norepinephrine (noradrenaline) on their targets; these synapses can also be either excitatory or inhibitory.

The lateral grey column receives input signals from preganglionic, myelinated fibers from viscera (internal organs), which course through prevertebral ganglia (between the visceral organ and the sympathetic chain) and paravertebral ganglia (in the sympathetic chain), white rami communicantes, and dorsal roots to synapse on cells of the intermediolateral cell column in the lateral horn.

Lateral grey column nerve cells also receive signals from the brainstem and from neurons in the hypothalamus, a brain area involved in mediating many physiological functions and emotional states.

== Clinical significance ==
Horner's syndrome is characterized by small pupils, sunken eyes, partially drooping eyelid, and dryness of the skin on the face. It is caused by problems in autonomic pathways such as damage to the lateral grey column.

Progressive autonomic failure is a disease associated with autonomic disturbances due to selective neuronal degeneration. A study estimated the number of nerve cells in the lateral grey columns of 21 people with progressive autonomic failure in comparison with a control group. This same study found that an average of 75 percent of the lateral column cells were lost in people with progressive autonomic failure.

Multiple system atrophy (MSA) is an adult onset disorder that is a sporadic and progressive. MSA is characterized by a combination of ataxia, parkinsonism, and autonomic dysfunction. A study did a comparison with the lateral grey column nerve cell count between 15 cases of patients with MSA and a control group. All cases of MSA had lost over 50 percent of their lateral horn cells which shows the involvement of the intermediolateral columns in MSA.

Lichtheim's disease (also known as subacute combined degeneration) is the result of a vitamin B12 deficiency and is associated with pernicious anemia. The disease is characterized by the degeneration of both the lateral and posterior columns, which results in symptoms such as a spastic ataxic gait and paranoia. Patients may also feel tingling or weakness in their limbs and torso.
