= Communicans =

Communicans is a Latin word meaning "communicating". It is most commonly used in medical or biological terminology.

- The rami communicans are connective spinal nerves that attach to the ganglion of the sympathetic trunk. The two branches of the nerves are termed the White ramus communicans.
- The arteria comminicans are the three arteries in the brain that form the circle of Willis. Communicating artery is a synonym for this term.
- The macula communicans (or zonula communicans) is a synonym for a gap junction. These are locations on the cellular membrane that lie 2–4 nm from an adjacent cell and are penetrated by a connexon.
- A ductus communicans is a constriction of a swim bladder between the anterior and posterior chambers.
