= Lumbar ganglia =

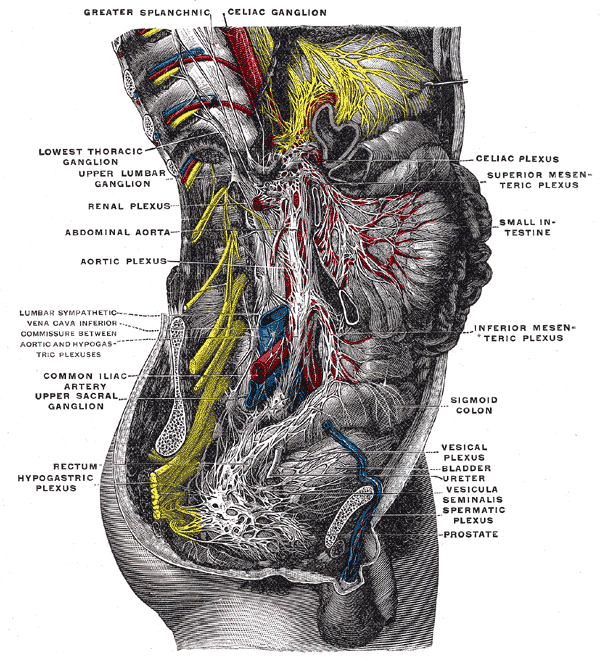
- Lower half of right sympathetic cord.

Details

Identifiers
- Latin: Ganglia lumbalia Ganglia lumbaria
- TA98: A14.3.01.033
- TA2: 6614
- FMA: 77578

The lumbar ganglia are paravertebral ganglia located in the inferior portion of the sympathetic trunk. The lumbar portion of the sympathetic trunk typically has 4 lumbar ganglia. The lumbar splanchnic nerves arise from the ganglia here, and contribute sympathetic efferent fibers to the nearby plexuses. The first two lumbar ganglia have both white and gray rami communicates.

== Function ==
Paravertebral ganglia are divided into cervical, thoracic, lumbar, and sacral ganglia. Each controls different glands and muscle groups since each muscle and gland receives input from postganglionic neurons that originated from different levels of paravertebral ganglia.

The lumbar part of the sympathetic trunk contains four interconnected ganglia. Superiorly, it is continuous with thoracic sympathetic ganglion and inferiorly continuous with sacral sympathetic ganglion. Presynaptic neurons traveling from the spinal cord terminate in the paravertebral ganglia (cervical, thoracic, lumbar, sacral) or the prevertebral ganglia. They synapse with either the postsynaptic neuron of the corresponding level of the spinal cord or ascend and descend to synapse at the lower or upper paravertebral ganglia, respectively. Neurotransmitters are released in the paravertebral ganglia to activate the postganglionic neurons to send efferent sympathetic output to the lower extremities to prepare the body for the “fight or flight” responses. These responses include dilating pupils, constricting blood vessels, and stimulating the secretion of acetylcholine, which causes smooth muscle contraction that leads to an increase in heart rate, blood sugar level, and blood pressure. The lumbar region L1 and L2 consist of neurons that innervate the adrenal gland, ureter, bladder, the lower extremities. The upper two lumbar ganglia (L1 and L2) of the sympathetic chain also give rise to the lumbar splanchnic nerves. Splanchnic nerves are paired visceral nerves carrying preganglionic sympathetic and general visceral afferent fibers. The lumbar splanchnic nerves travel through the lumbar sympathetic ganglion but do not synapse there. Instead, they synapse at the inferior mesenteric ganglion and innervate the smooth muscle lining the large intestines, kidney, bladder, glands of the hindgut, and pelvic viscera.

== Clinical Significance ==
Because the lumbar sympathetic nerve fibers control the muscle of the lower extremities during “fight or flight” response, treatment targeting this region can help relieve chronic leg pain. One common procedure is the lumbar sympathetic nerve block. This procedure involves an injection of an anesthetic in the sympathetic nerve tissue to block the sympathetic nerves ipsilaterally and test for any damage to the sympathetic nerve chain. By disrupting the nerve supply from the sympathetic chain to the lower extremities, monitoring the decrease of pain and swelling in these regions can help locate the origin of pain in the patient. Because the blocking procedure is safe and minimally invasive, this treatment is used for a multitude of sympathetic mediated pain disorders, including complex regional pain syndrome (CRPS) that causes dysregulation of the central and autonomic nervous system. This causes an upregulation of pain and temperature control to the extremity that is affected. However, the patient could experience an allergic reaction to the medications given during the procedure if the patient has uncontrolled diabetes, poorly controlled heart problems, or is under other medications.

Managing neuropathic pain is another use for a lumbar sympathetic block. The technique for this procedure is very specific. A fluoroscopic imaging projector is used to position the L2 and L3 to make it easily visible for the physician. The needle is aimed toward the anterior portion of the vertebral bodies of L2 and L3, and a c-arm is used to align specific views of the vertebral bodies. Since the great vessels are located ventrally to the vertebral bodies, the needle should be three to five millimeters dorsal to the most ventral portion of the vertebral body. The injection occurs once the correct position has been put in place. The physician should be able to see the coverage of the anterior portion of the vertebral body from L1 to L3. An increase by two or three degrees Celsius in the affected limb indicates a successful injection. Blood vessel dilation may also cause the affected limb to look very flushed.
