= Ramus communicans =

Latin term used for a nerve which connects two other nerves

- Scheme showing structure of a typical spinal nerve. 1. Somatic efferent. 2. Somatic afferent. 3,4,5. Sympathetic efferent. 6,7. Autonomic afferent.

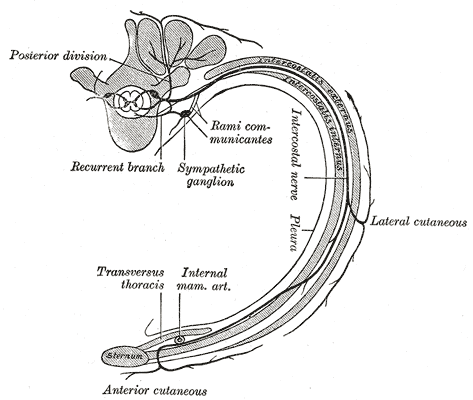
- Diagram of the course and branches of a typical intercostal nerve. (Rami communicantes labeled at center.)

Details

Identifiers
- Latin: ramus communicans nervorum spinalium
- TA98: A14.2.00.033; A12.2.16.073
- FMA: 5874

Ramus communicans (pl.: rami communicantes) is the Latin term used for a nerve which connects two other nerves, and can be translated as "communicating branch".

== Structure ==
When used without further definition, it almost always refers to a communicating branch between a spinal nerve and the sympathetic trunk. More specifically, it usually refers to one of the following :

- Gray ramus communicans
- White ramus communicans

The grey and white rami communicantes are responsible for conveying autonomic signals, specifically for the sympathetic nervous system. Their difference in colouration is caused by differences in myelination of the nerve fibres contained within, i.e. there are more myelinated than unmyelinated fibres in the white rami communicantes while the converse is true for the grey rami communicantes.

=== Gray ramus communicans ===
The grey rami communicantes exist at every level of the spinal cord and are responsible for carrying postganglionic nerve fibres from the paravertebral ganglia to their destination, and for carrying those preganglionic nerve fibres which enter the paravertebral ganglia but do not synapse.

=== White ramus communicans ===
The white rami communicantes exist only at the levels of the spinal cord where the intermediolateral cell column is present (T1-L2) and are responsible for carrying preganglionic nerve fibres from the spinal cord to the paravertebral ganglia.

Both ramus within the spinal nerve cross each other, being the white further away from the intervertebral foramen when exiting the spinal nerve to enter the ganglia. (More so, some fibres from the white ramus may migrate to other ganglia without even synapsis on its level)
