= Cervical ganglia =

CERVICAL GANGLIA
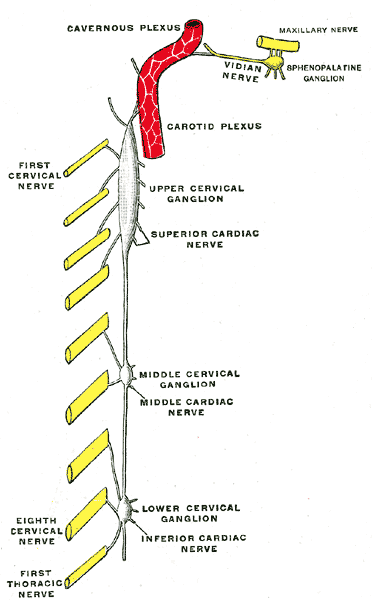
- Diagram of the cervical sympathetic.

Details

Identifiers
- Latin: Ganglia cervicale

The cervical ganglia are paravertebral ganglia of the sympathetic nervous system. Preganglionic nerves from the thoracic spinal cord enter into the cervical ganglions and synapse with its postganglionic fibers or nerves. The cervical ganglion has three paravertebral ganglia:

- superior cervical ganglion (largest) – adjacent to C2 & C3; postganglionic axon projects to target: (heart, head, neck) via "hitchhiking" on the carotid arteries
- middle cervical ganglion (smallest) – adjacent to C6; target: heart, neck
- inferior cervical ganglion. The inferior ganglion may be fused with the first thoracic ganglion to form a single structure, the stellate ganglion. – adjacent to C7; target: heart, lower neck, arm, posterior cranial arteries

Nerves emerging from cervical sympathetic ganglia contribute to the cardiac plexus, among other things. Unlike all other ganglia, the medial branches of the cervical ganglia are 95% postganglionic axons.

== Additional images ==
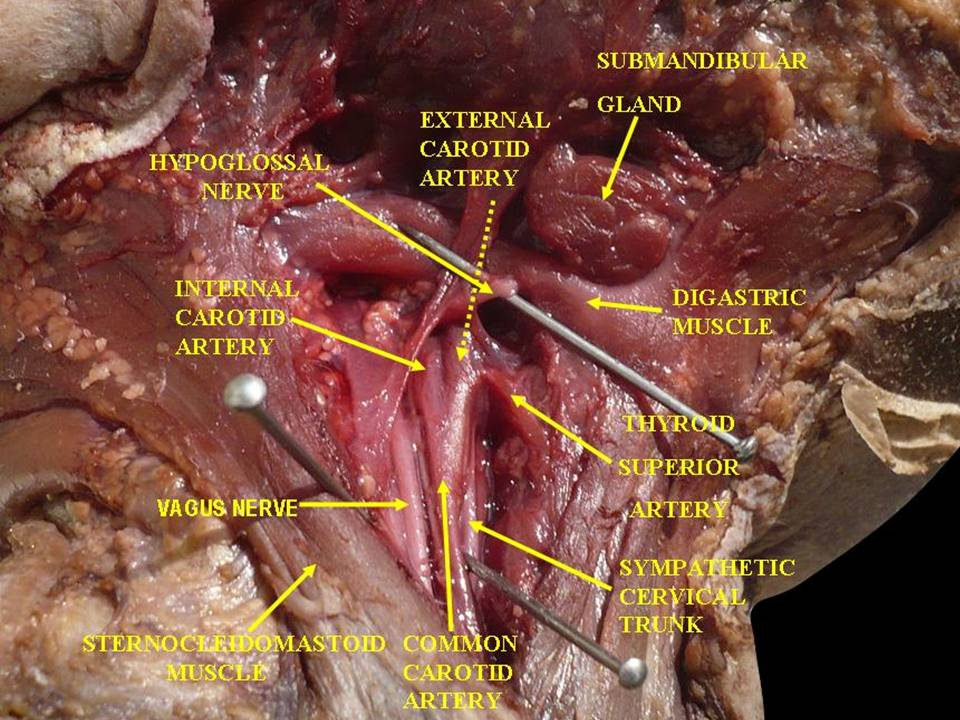
Muscles, arteries and nerves of neck. Newborn dissection.
