= Sacral splanchnic nerves =

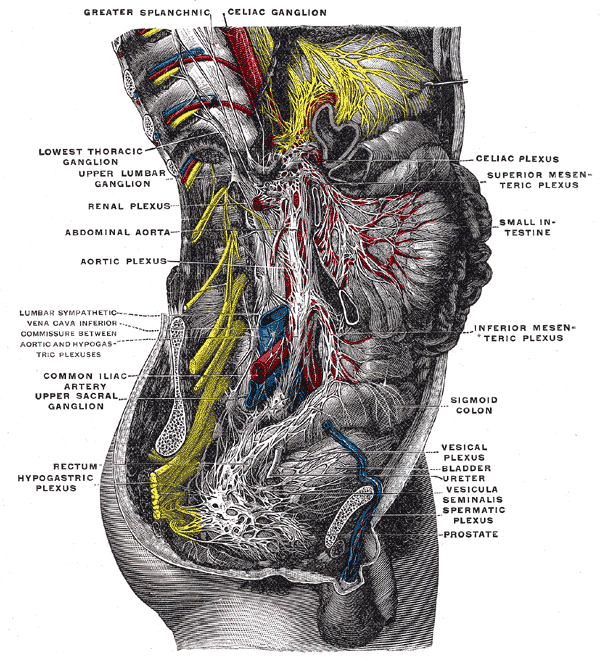
- Lower half of right sympathetic cord. (Sacral splanchnic nerves not pictured, but upper sacral ganglion and hypogastric plexus are labeled at bottom left.)

Details
- From: Sacral ganglia

Identifiers
- Latin: nervi splanchnici sacrales
- TA98: A14.3.01.036
- TA2: 6636
- FMA: 6288

Sacral splanchnic nerves are splanchnic nerves that connect the inferior hypogastric plexus to the sympathetic trunk in the pelvis.

== Structure ==
The sacral sympathetic nerves arise from the sacral part of the sympathetic trunk, emerging anteriorly from the ganglia. They travel to their corresponding side's inferior hypogastric plexus, where the preganglionic nerve fibers synapse with the postganglionic sympathetic neurons, whose fibers ascend to the superior hypogastric plexus, the aortic plexus and the inferior mesenteric plexus, where they are distributed to the anal canal. From the inferior hypogastric plexus, they also innervate pelvic organs and vessels.

The sacral sympathetic nerves contain a mix of preganglionic and postganglionic sympathetic fibers, but mostly preganglionic. They also contain general visceral afferent fibers. They are found in the same region as the pelvic splanchnic nerves, which arise from the sacral spinal nerves to provide parasympathetic fibers to the inferior hypogastric plexus.

== See also ==
- Pelvic splanchnic nerves
