= Autonomic ganglion =

Cluster of nerve cell bodies in the autonomic nervous system

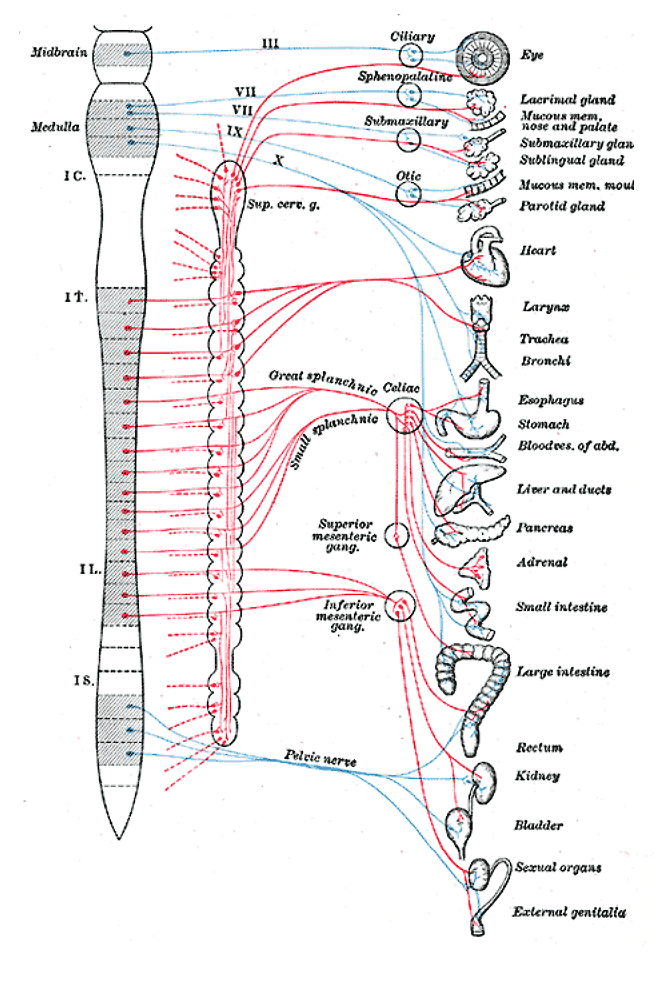
- Autonomic nervous system innervation, showing the sympathetic and parasympathetic (craniosacral) systems, in red and blue, respectively

Details

Identifiers
- Latin: ganglion autonomicum
- MeSH: D005725
- TA98: A14.2.00.008
- TA2: 6171
- FMA: 5889

An autonomic ganglion is a cluster of nerve cell bodies (a ganglion) in the autonomic nervous system. The two types are the sympathetic ganglion and the parasympathetic ganglion. It is located at the synapse of the preganglionic neuron (connects CNS to ganglia) and postganglionic neuron (connects ganglia to effector), which has its cell body in the ganglia.
