= Sacral ganglia =

Details
- To: Sacral splanchnic nerves

Identifiers
- Latin: ganglia sacralia
- TA98: A14.3.01.035
- TA2: 6615
- FMA: 77579

The sacral ganglia are paravertebral ganglia of the sympathetic trunk.^{:39} As the sympathetic trunk heads inferiorly down the sacrum, it turns medially. There are generally four or five sacral ganglia. In addition to gray rami communicantes, the ganglia send off sacral splanchnic nerves to join the inferior hypogastric plexus. Near the coccyx, the right and left sympathetic trunks join to form the ganglion impar.

The sacral ganglia innervate blood vessels and sweat glands of the lower limbs.

== Clinical significance ==
Recurrences of genital herpes are caused by herpes simplex virus (either HSV-1 or HSV-2) which lies dormant in the sacral ganglia between bouts of active infection. Either primary infection or reactivation may be silent or symptomatic.
