= Small intensely fluorescent cell =

Small intensely fluorescent cells (SIF cells) are the interneurons of the sympathetic ganglia (postganglionic neurons) of the Sympathetic division of the autonomic nervous system (ANS). The neurotransmitter for these cells is dopamine. They are a neural crest derivative and share a common sympathoadrenal precursor cell with sympathetic neurons and chromaffin cells (adrenal medulla).

Although an autonomic ganglion is the site where preganglionic fibers synapse on postganglionic neurons, the presence of small interneurons has been recognized. These cells exhibit catecholamine fluorescence and are referred to as small intensely fluorescent (SIF) cells. In some ganglia, these intemeurons receive preganglionic cholinergic fibers and may modulate ganglionic transmission. In other ganglia, they receive collateral branches and may serve some Integrative function. Many SIF cells contain dopamine, which Is thought to be their transmitter.
