= Ganglion =

Clusters of neurons in the peripheral nervous system

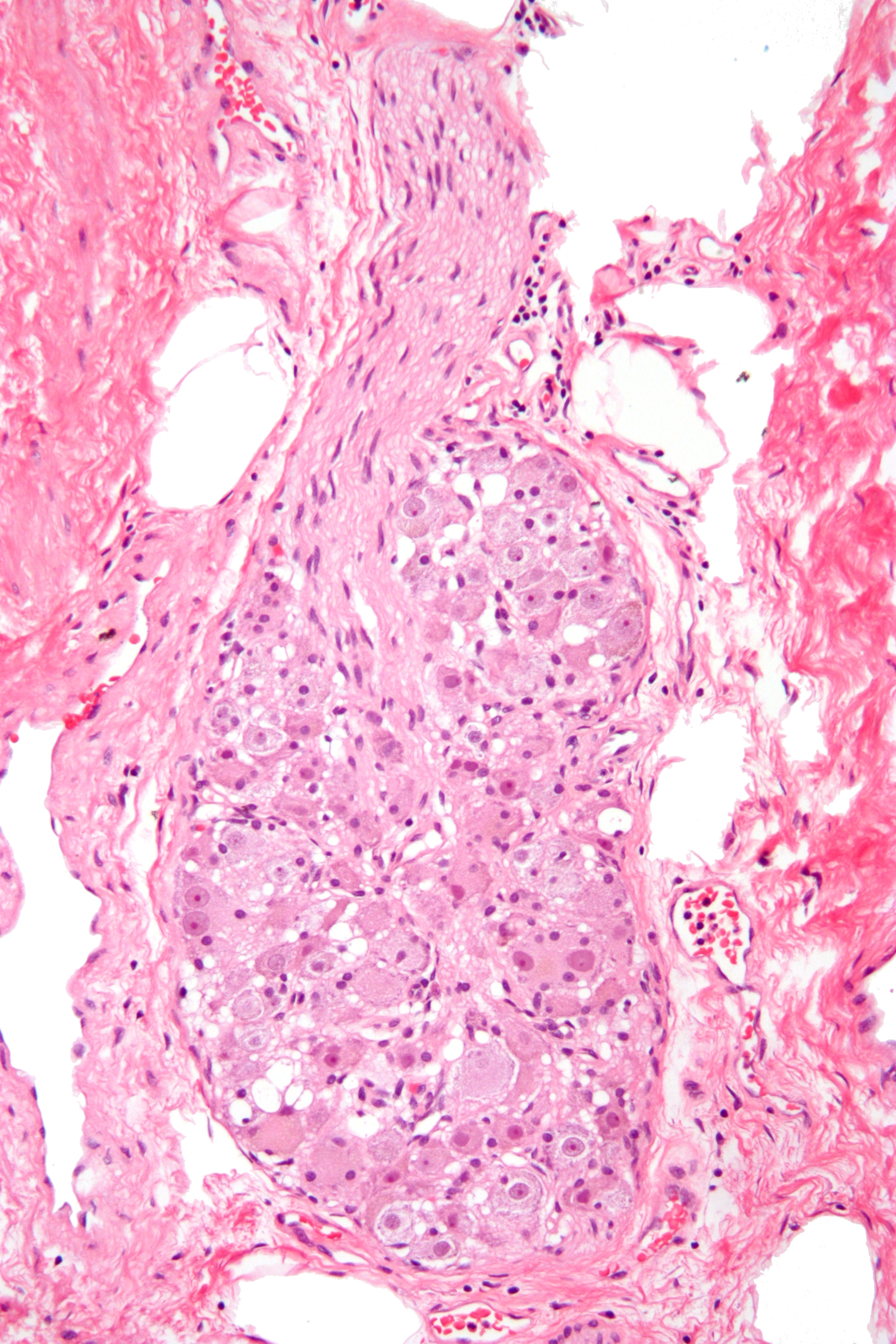
- Micrograph of a ganglion. H&E stain.

Details
- System: Nervous system

Identifiers
- Latin: ganglion
- MeSH: D005724
- TA98: A14.2.00.002
- FMA: 5884

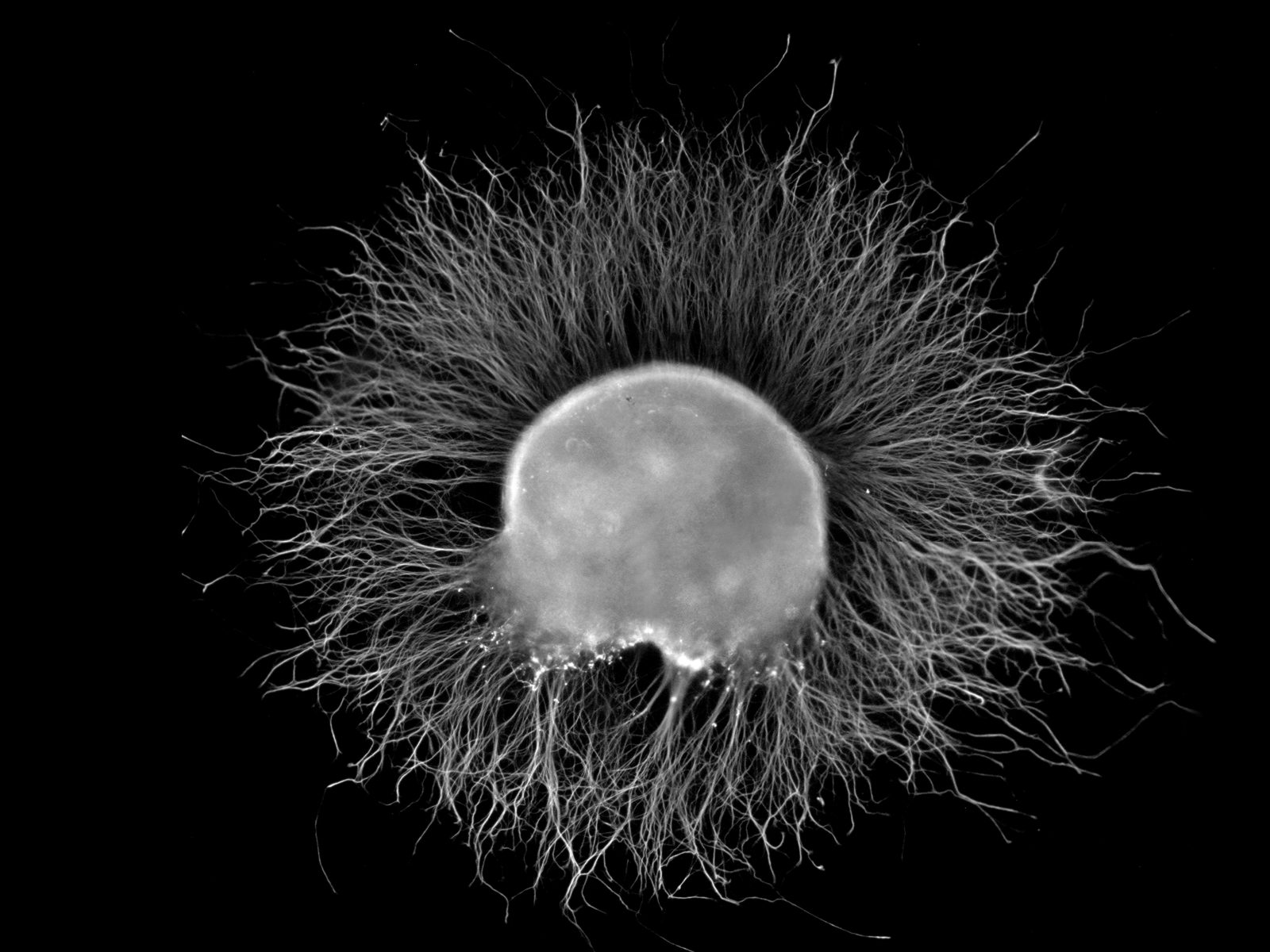
A dorsal root ganglion (DRG) from a chicken embryo (around stage of day 7) after incubation overnight in NGF growth medium stained with anti-neurofilament antibody. Note the axons growing out of the ganglion.

A ganglion (pl.: ganglia) is a group of neuron cell bodies in the peripheral nervous system. In the somatic nervous system, this includes dorsal root ganglia and trigeminal ganglia among a few others. In the autonomic nervous system, there are both sympathetic and parasympathetic ganglia which contain the cell bodies of postganglionic sympathetic and parasympathetic neurons respectively.

A pseudoganglion looks like a ganglion, but only has nerve fibers and has few nerve cell bodies.

The restriction of the ganglion to refer to structures in the peripheral nervous system postdates the naming of brain structures such as the basal ganglia, which has remained as a historical artifact in vertebrate terminology. Among invertebrates the restriction is disregarded: for example, the main part of the insect brain is called the cerebral ganglion.

== Structure ==
Ganglia are primarily made up of somata and dendritic structures, which are bundled or connected. Ganglia often interconnect with other ganglia to form a complex system of ganglia known as a plexus. Ganglia provide relay points and intermediary connections between different neurological structures in the body, such as the peripheral and central nervous systems.

Among vertebrates there are three major groups of ganglia:

- Dorsal root ganglia (also known as the spinal ganglia) contain the cell bodies of sensory (afferent) neurons.
- Cranial nerve ganglia contain the cell bodies of cranial nerve neurons.
- Autonomic ganglia contain the cell bodies of autonomic nerves.

In the autonomic nervous system, fibers from the central nervous system to the ganglia are known as preganglionic fibers, while those from the ganglia to the effector organ are called postganglionic fibers.

=== Basal ganglia ===
The term "ganglion" refers to the peripheral nervous system.

However, in the brain (part of the central nervous system), the basal ganglia are a group of nuclei interconnected with the cerebral cortex, thalamus, and brainstem, associated with a variety of functions: motor control, cognition, emotions, and learning.

Partly due to this ambiguity, the Terminologia Anatomica recommends using the term 'basal nuclei' instead of 'basal ganglia'; however, this usage has not been generally adopted.

=== Pseudoganglion ===
A pseudoganglion is a localized thickening of the main part or trunk of a nerve that has the appearance of a ganglion but has only nerve fibers and no nerve cell bodies.

Pseudoganglia are found in the teres minor muscle and radial nerve.

== See also ==
- Sympathetic ganglion
- Ganglion cyst
- Nervous system
- Neuron
- Chiasm
