= White ramus communicans =

Nerve tract

- Scheme showing structure of a typical spinal nerve. 1. Somatic efferent. 2. Somatic afferent. 3, 4, 5. Sympathetic efferent. 6, 7. Visceral afferent.

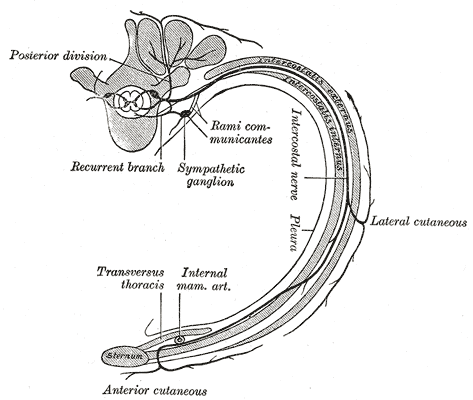
- Diagram of the course and branches of a typical intercostal nerve. (Rami communicantes labeled at center.)

Details

Identifiers
- Latin: ramus communicans albus nervi spinalis
- TA98: A14.3.01.007
- TA2: 6150
- FMA: 5875

The white ramus communicans (pl.: rami communicantes) from Latin ramus (branch) and communicans (communicating) is the preganglionic sympathetic outflow nerve tract from the spinal cord.

Each of the thoracic, and the first and second lumbar nerves contribute a white ramus communicans to the adjoining sympathetic ganglion, unlike the gray rami which are located at each spinal level. White rami communicantes contain both myelinated and unmyelinated preganglionic sympathetic fibers, (GVE and GVA), the white ramus appears white because there are more myelinated than unmyelinated fibers unlike the gray rami.

== Structure ==
The white rami communicantes are the preganglionic sympathetic outflow from the spinal cord.

The cell bodies for the preganglionic sympathetic myelinated fibers in the white rami communicantes lie in the ipsilateral (same sided) intermediolateral cell column in the spinal cord which extends from T1-L2. These rami also contain general visceral afferent fibers (sensory from the organs) whose primary cell bodies reside dorsal root ganglia (which then synapse in the dorsal horn). The preganglionic sympathetic fibers will enter into the sympathetic trunk and either synapse at the ganglion on the same level, or travel up or down the sympathetic trunk to arrive at the correct spinal level for their action. Once they synapse in the sympathetic ganglion in the sympathetic trunk, they exit the trunk as gray rami to join the spinal nerve and innervate the appropriate structure. Even though the sympathetic trunk extends below L2, there are no more white rami communicantes below L2 because the intermediolateral cell column ends before this. The fibers of the sympathetic trunk above and below T1-L2 originate from white rami communicantes within T1-L2. Above and below T1-L2 there are only gray rami. Cell column are the important features of white rami communicates.

== Additional images ==
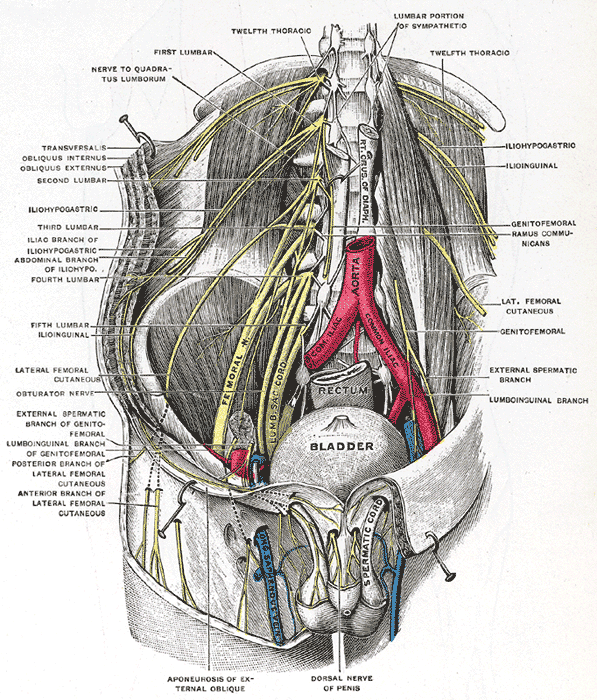
Deep and superficial dissection of the lumbar plexus.

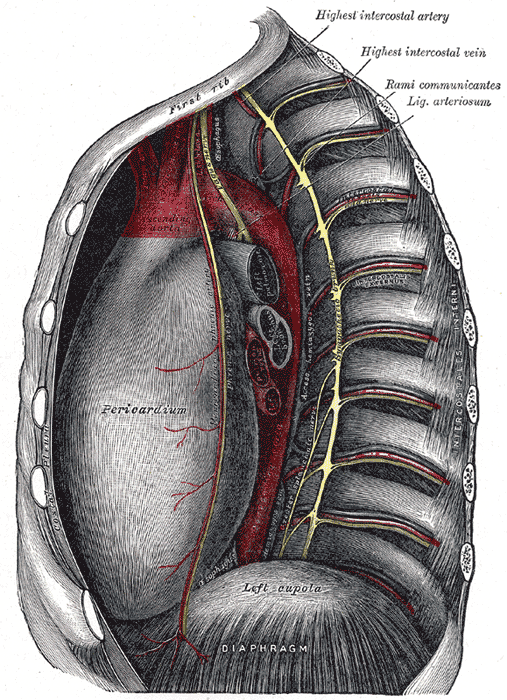
Thoracic portion of the sympathetic trunk.

== See also ==
- Gray ramus communicans
