= Intermediolateral nucleus =

Cluster of neurons in the spinal cord

- Medulla spinalis (Intermediolateral nucleus visible at right in green.)

Details
- Part of: Spinal cord

Identifiers
- Latin: nucleus intermediolateralis medullae spinalis
- NeuroNames: 1667
- TA98: A14.1.02.133
- TA2: 6078
- FMA: 73915

The intermediolateral nucleus (IML) is located in Rexed lamina VII of the lateral grey column, one of three grey matter columns found in the spinal cord.

The intermediolateral cell column exists at vertebral levels T1 – L3. It mediates the entire sympathetic innervation of the body, but the nucleus resides in the grey matter of the spinal cord.

Rexed Lamina VII contains several well defined nuclei including the posterior thoracic nucleus (Clarke's column), the intermediolateral nucleus, and the sacral autonomic nucleus.

It extends from T1 to L3, and contains the autonomic motor neurons that give rise to the preganglionic fibers of the sympathetic nervous system, (preganglionic sympathetic general visceral efferents).
