= Parasympathetic ganglia =

Autonomic ganglia of the parasympathetic nervous system

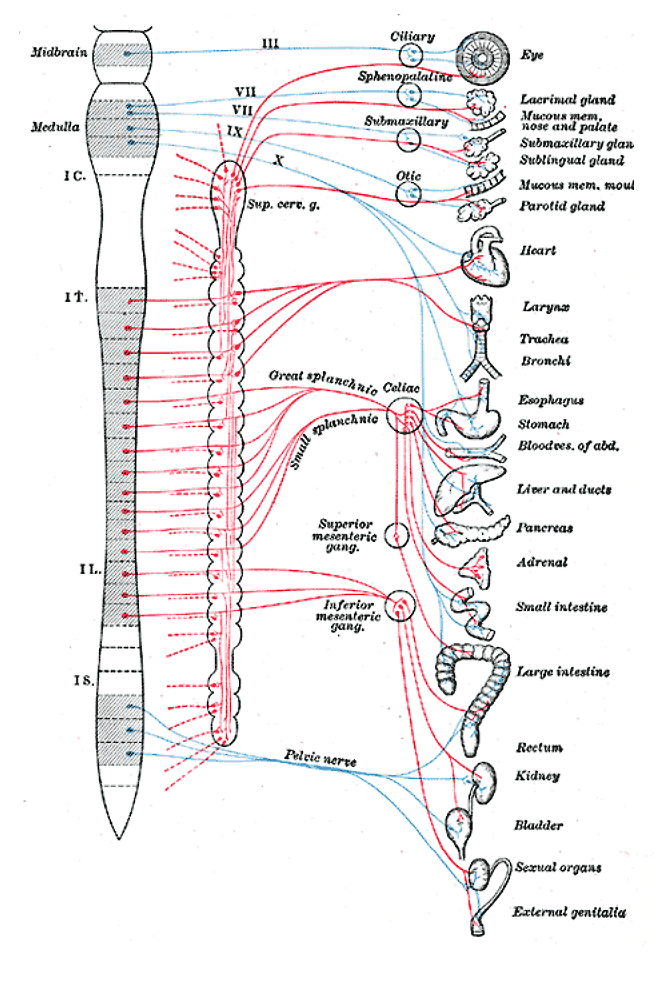
- Autonomic nervous system innervation, showing the sympathetic and parasympathetic (craniosacral) systems, in red and blue, respectively

Details

Identifiers
- Latin: ganglia parasympathicum
- MeSH: D005726
- TA98: A14.2.00.012
- TA2: 6170
- FMA: 5894

Parasympathetic ganglia are the autonomic ganglia of the parasympathetic nervous system. Most are small terminal ganglia or intramural ganglia, so named because they lie near or within (respectively) the organs they innervate. The exceptions are the four paired parasympathetic ganglia of the head and neck.

== Parasympathetic ganglia of the head and neck ==
These paired ganglia supply all parasympathetic innervation to the head and neck.

- Ciliary ganglion (sphincter pupillae, ciliary muscle)
- Pterygopalatine ganglion (lacrimal gland, glands of nasal cavity)
- Submandibular ganglion (submandibular and sublingual glands)
- Otic ganglion (parotid gland)

== Roots ==
Each has three roots entering the ganglion and a variable number of exiting branches.

- The motor root carries presynaptic parasympathetic nerve fibers (GVE) that terminate in the ganglion and synapse with the postsynaptic fibers that, in turn, project to target organs.
- The sympathetic root carries postsynaptic sympathetic fibers (GVE) that traverse the ganglion without synapsing.
- The sensory root carries general sensory fibers (GSA) that also do not synapse in the ganglion.

Some ganglia also carry special sensory fibers (SVA) for taste sensation.

== Nerves supplying parasympathetic fibers ==
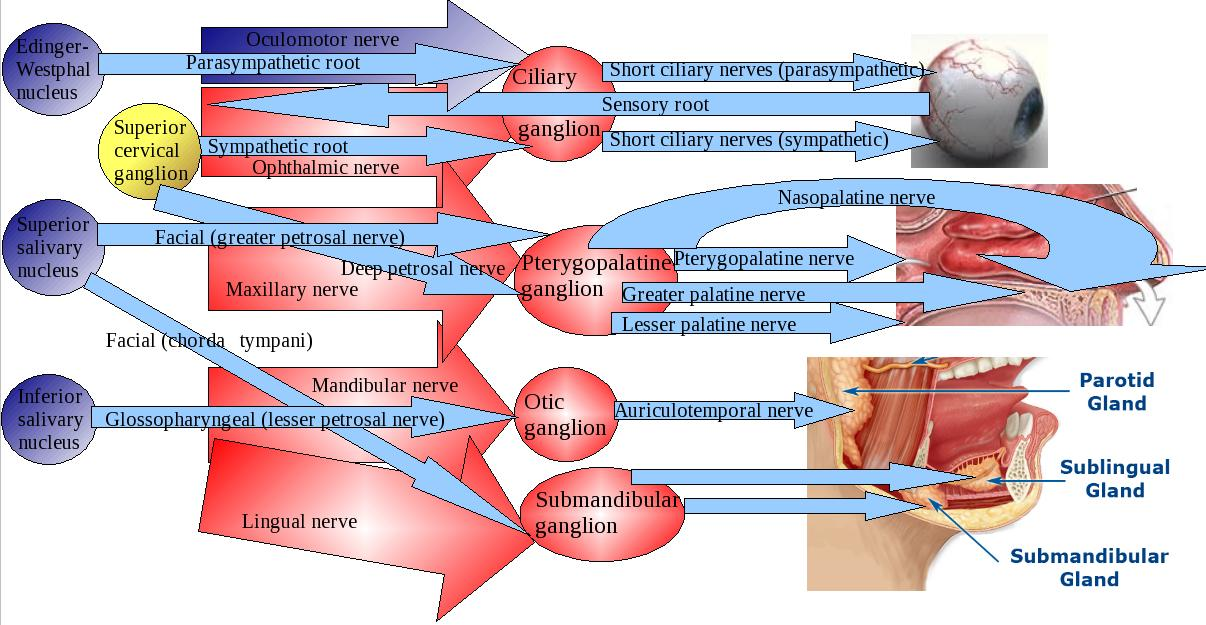
Parasympathetic ganglia of the head

- Oculomotor nerve (ciliary ganglion)
- Facial nerve (pterygopalatine ganglion, submandibular ganglion)
- Glossopharyngeal nerve (otic ganglion)
- Vagus nerve (no named ganglion)
- Pelvic splanchnic nerves
