= Postganglionic nerve fibers =

Fibers from the ganglion to the effector organ

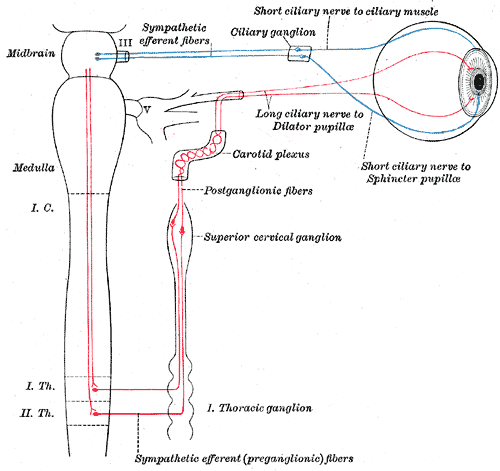
- Sympathetic connections of the ciliary and superior cervical ganglia.

Details

Identifiers
- Latin: neurofibrae postganglionicae
- TA98: A14.2.00.010
- FMA: 76569

Acetylcholine

Norepinephrine

In the autonomic nervous system, nerve fibers from the ganglion to the effector organ are called postganglionic nerve fibers.

== Neurotransmitters ==
The neurotransmitters of postganglionic fibers differ:

- In the parasympathetic division, neurons are cholinergic. That is to say acetylcholine is the primary neurotransmitter responsible for the communication between neurons on the parasympathetic pathway.
- In the sympathetic division, neurons are mostly adrenergic (that is, epinephrine and norepinephrine function as the primary neurotransmitters). Notable exceptions to this rule include the sympathetic innervation of sweat glands and arrectores pilorum muscles where the neurotransmitter at both pre and post ganglionic synapses is acetylcholine. Another notable structure is the medulla of the adrenal gland, where chromaffin cells function as modified post-ganglionic nerves. Instead of releasing epinephrine and norepinephrine into a synaptic cleft, these cells of the adrenal medulla release the catecholamines into the blood stream as hormones. Like other components of the sympathetic nervous system, all of these exceptions are still stimulated by cholinergic preganglionic fibers.
- In both divisions of the autonomic nervous system, postganglionic neurons express nicotinic acetylcholine receptors to receive signals from preganglionic neurons.

== See also ==
- Nerve fiber
- Terminal cisterna
- Rexed lamina
- Preganglionic nerve fiber
- Splanchnic nerve
- Lateral grey column
