= Preganglionic nerve fibers =

Nerve fibers connecting the central nervous system to a ganglion

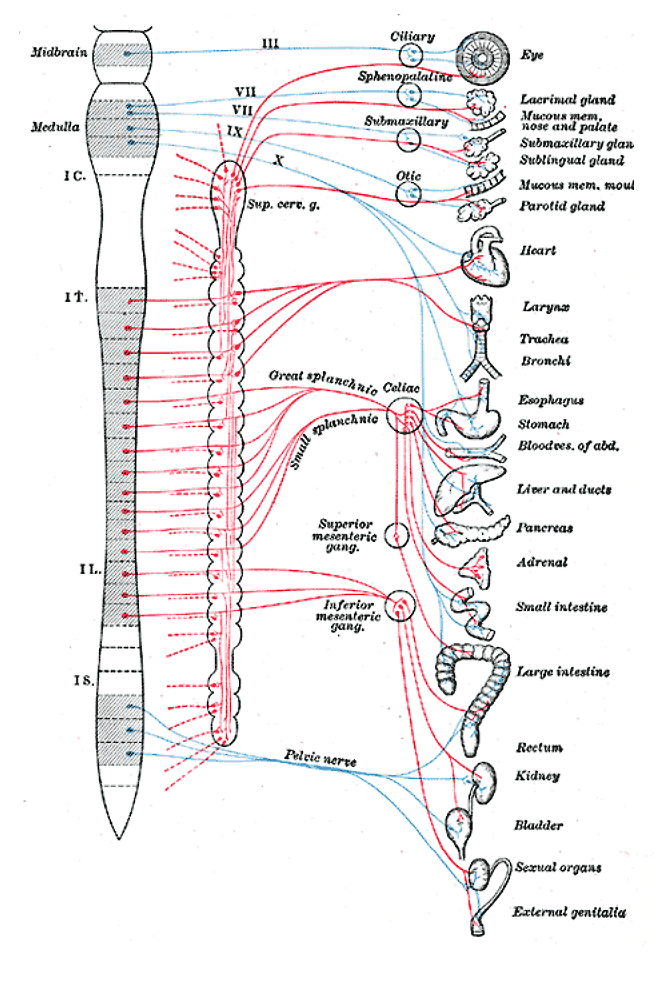
- Autonomic nervous system innervation, showing the sympathetic and parasympathetic (craniosacral) systems, in red and blue, respectively

Details

Identifiers
- Latin: neurofibrae preganglionicae
- TA98: A14.2.00.009
- FMA: 76568

In the autonomic nervous system, nerve fibers from the central nervous system to the ganglion are known as preganglionic nerve fibers. All preganglionic fibers, whether they are in the sympathetic division or in the parasympathetic division, are cholinergic (that is, these fibers use acetylcholine as their neurotransmitter) and they are myelinated.

Sympathetic preganglionic fibers tend to be shorter than parasympathetic preganglionic fibers because sympathetic ganglia are often closer to the spinal cord than are the parasympathetic ganglia. Another major difference between the two ANS (autonomic nervous systems) is divergence. Whereas in the parasympathetic division there is a divergence factor of roughly 1:4, in the sympathetic division there can be a divergence of up to 1:20. This is due to the number of synapses formed by the preganglionic fibers with ganglionic neurons.

== See also ==
- Nerve fiber
- Grey column
- Terminal cisterna
- Rexed lamina
- Postganglionic nerve fiber
- Splanchnic nerve
- Lateral grey column
