= 1961 in science =

The year 1961 in science and technology involved some significant events, listed below.

== Astronomy and space exploration ==
- January 31 – Ham, a 37-pound male chimpanzee, is rocketed into space in a test of the Project Mercury capsule designed to carry United States astronauts into space.
- April 12 – Yuri Gagarin is the first human in space, making a single Low Earth orbit in Vostok 1 before parachuting to the ground.
- April 15 – R. N. Schwartz and Charles Hard Townes publish "Interstellar and Interplanetary Communication by Optical Masers" in Nature, providing a basis for Optical SETI.
- May 19 – Venera program: Venera 1 becomes the first manmade object to fly-by another planet by passing Venus (however the probe had lost contact with Earth a month earlier and does not send back any data).
- May 25 – Apollo program: President Kennedy announces before a special joint session of Congress his goal to initiate a project to put a "man on the Moon" before the end of the decade.
- The Drake equation is written by Frank Drake.

== Biochemistry ==
- Cephalosporin C is first characterized, by Guy Newton and Edward Abraham of the Sir William Dunn School of Pathology in the University of Oxford.

== Biology ==
- February 24 – Brattleboro rat strain first born.
- May 15 – J. Heinrich Matthaei performs the Poly-U-Experiment in the United States, opening the way to solution of the genetic code, a key event in modern genetics.
- Hayflick limit proposed by Leonard Hayflick.

== Chemistry ==
- Leonard Ornstein first describes disc electrophoresis.

== Computer science ==
- July – Rolf Landauer first formulates Landauer's principle.

== Geophysics ==
- April – Project Mohole begins.
- Francis Birch establishes Birch's law on compressional wave velocities.

== Mathematics ==
- Stephen Smale proves the Poincaré conjecture in dimensions greater than 4.

== Medicine ==
- March 9 – The United Kingdom Minister of Health, Enoch Powell, in his "water towers" speech to a Conservative Party conference, proposes closing down of large, traditional psychiatric hospitals in favour of more community-based care.
- Methicillin-resistant Staphylococcus aureus (MRSA) is first discovered, in the United Kingdom.
- New Zealand cardiologist J. C. P. Williams identifies Williams syndrome.

== Pharmacology ==
- The non-steroidal anti-inflammatory drug Ibuprofen, derived from propanoic acid by the research arm of Boots UK (Andrew R. M. Dunlop with Stewart Adams, John Nicholson, Vonleigh Simmons, Jeff Wilson and Colin Burrows), is patented.
- Thalidomide is withdrawn from sale as a morning sickness inhibitor in Europe.

== Physics ==
- February 14 – Discovery of the chemical elements: Element 103, Lawrencium, is first synthesized at Berkeley, California.
- October 30 – The largest nuclear weapon by yield, Tsar Bomba, is detonated in Russia, having a 50-megaton yield.
- Bark scale by German acoustics scientist Eberhard Zwicker.
- Spain joins CERN; Yugoslavia leaves.

== Psychology ==
- July – First Milgram experiment on obedience to authority figures.

== Technology ==
- June – RPG-7 rocket-propelled grenade launcher introduced in the Soviet Union.
- September 12 – V/STOL aircraft Hawker Siddeley P.1127 makes its first transitions from vertical to horizontal flight and back, using thrust vectoring.
- James L. Buie patents transistor-coupled transistor logic, later known as transistor-to-transistor logic circuitry (TTL), used in integrated circuits.
- Philips publicly introduce the compact audio cassette tape system, developed by a team led by Lou Ottens.
- Butler matrix for beamforming first proposed.

== Zoology ==
- April 3 – A Leadbeater's possum, a marsupial species thought to have been extinct for over 50 years, is discovered in New South Wales (Australia).
- April 29 – World Wildlife Fund established.
- November 9 – First edition of new International Code of Zoological Nomenclature published.

== Awards ==
- Nobel Prizes
  - Physics – Robert Hofstadter, Rudolf Ludwig Mössbauer
  - Chemistry – Melvin Calvin
  - Medicine – Georg von Békésy

== Births ==
- February 24 – Ellen Stofan, American planetary scientist.
- March 10 – Laurel Clark (died 2003), American astronaut.
- March 15 – Moungi Bawendi, French-born Tunisian American chemist, recipient of Nobel Prize in Chemistry.
- July 1 – Kalpana Chawla (died 2003), Indian astronaut.
- August – Zhang Xu, Chinese neuroscientist.
- Mary E. Brunkow, American molecular biologist, recipient of Nobel Prize in Physiology or Medicine.
- Andreas Weigend, German data scientist.

== Deaths ==
- January 4 – Erwin Schrödinger (born 1887), Austrian physicist.
- April 17 – Elda Emma Anderson (born 1899), American nuclear and health physicist, of leukemia.
- May 29 – Arnold Gesell (born 1880), American developmental psychologist.
- June 4 – William Astbury (born 1898), English physicist and molecular biologist.
- June 6 – Carl Jung (born 1875), Swiss psychiatrist.
- July 17 – Abner Doble (born 1890), American steam engineer.
- September 4 – Emil von Dungern (born 1867), German serologist.
- November 15 – Johanna Westerdijk (born 1883), Dutch plant pathologist.
- November 30 – Ehrenfried Pfeiffer (born 1899), German soil scientist.
- December 2 – Sven Sømme (born 1904), Norwegian ichthyologist and resistance worker.
