= Zhang Xu (disambiguation) =

Zhang Xu was an 8th-century Tang-dynasty Chinese calligrapher.

Zhang Xu or Chang Hsu is also the name of:

- Zhang Xu (engineer) (张煦; 1913–2015), Chinese telecommunications engineer
- Zhang Xu (neuroscientist) (张旭; born 1961), Chinese neuroscientist
- Cho U or Zhang Xu (張栩; born 1980), Taiwanese go player
