= List of MeSH codes (B01) =

The following is a partial list of the "B" codes for Medical Subject Headings (MeSH), as defined by the United States National Library of Medicine (NLM).

This list continues the information at List of MeSH codes (A17). Codes following these are found at List of MeSH codes (B02). For other MeSH codes, see List of MeSH codes.

The source for this content is the set of 2006 MeSH Trees from the NLM.

== MeSH B01.050 – animals ==
=== MeSH B01.050.050 – animal population groups ===
==== MeSH B01.050.157 – animals, inbred strains ====
- MeSH B01.050.157.040 – animals, congenic
- MeSH B01.050.157.040.500 – mice, congenic
- MeSH B01.050.157.520 – mice, inbred strains
- MeSH B01.050.157.520.300 – mice, inbred a
- MeSH B01.050.157.520.318 – mice, inbred akr
- MeSH B01.050.157.520.338 – mice, inbred balb c
- MeSH B01.050.157.520.388 – mice, inbred c3h
- MeSH B01.050.157.520.420 – mice, inbred c57bl
- MeSH B01.050.157.520.420.500 – mice, inbred mdx
- MeSH B01.050.157.520.440 – mice, inbred cba
- MeSH B01.050.157.520.445 – mice, inbred cftr
- MeSH B01.050.157.520.460 – mice, inbred dba
- MeSH B01.050.157.520.480 – mice, inbred hrs
- MeSH B01.050.157.520.510 – mice, inbred icr
- MeSH B01.050.157.520.555 – mice, inbred mrl lpr
- MeSH B01.050.157.520.565 – mice, inbred nod
- MeSH B01.050.157.520.580 – mice, inbred nzb
- MeSH B01.050.157.520.600 – mice, inbred sencar
- MeSH B01.050.157.760 – rats, inbred strains
- MeSH B01.050.157.760.080 – rats, inbred aci
- MeSH B01.050.157.760.090 – rats, inbred bb
- MeSH B01.050.157.760.110 – rats, inbred bn
- MeSH B01.050.157.760.130 – rats, inbred buf
- MeSH B01.050.157.760.165 – rats, inbred dahl
- MeSH B01.050.157.760.200 – rats, inbred f344
- MeSH B01.050.157.760.275 – rats, inbred lec
- MeSH B01.050.157.760.280 – rats, inbred lew
- MeSH B01.050.157.760.290 – rats, inbred oletf
- MeSH B01.050.157.760.300 – rats, inbred shr
- MeSH B01.050.157.760.360 – rats, inbred wf
- MeSH B01.050.157.760.390 – rats, inbred wky

==== MeSH B01.050.199 – animals, laboratory ====
- MeSH B01.050.199.040 – animals, congenic
- MeSH B01.050.199.040.500 – mice, congenic
- MeSH B01.050.199.520 – animals, inbred strains
- MeSH B01.050.199.520.040 – animals, congenic
- MeSH B01.050.199.520.040.500 – mice, congenic
- MeSH B01.050.199.520.520 – mice, inbred strains
- MeSH B01.050.199.520.520.300 – mice, inbred a
- MeSH B01.050.199.520.520.318 – mice, inbred akr
- MeSH B01.050.199.520.520.338 – mice, inbred balb c
- MeSH B01.050.199.520.520.388 – mice, inbred c3h
- MeSH B01.050.199.520.520.420 – mice, inbred c57bl
- MeSH B01.050.199.520.520.420.500 – mice, inbred mdx
- MeSH B01.050.199.520.520.440 – mice, inbred cba
- MeSH B01.050.199.520.520.445 – mice, inbred cftr
- MeSH B01.050.199.520.520.460 – mice, inbred dba
- MeSH B01.050.199.520.520.480 – mice, inbred hrs
- MeSH B01.050.199.520.520.510 – mice, inbred icr
- MeSH B01.050.199.520.520.555 – mice, inbred mrl lpr
- MeSH B01.050.199.520.520.565 – mice, inbred nod
- MeSH B01.050.199.520.520.580 – mice, inbred nzb
- MeSH B01.050.199.520.520.600 – mice, inbred sencar
- MeSH B01.050.199.520.760 – rats, inbred strains
- MeSH B01.050.199.520.760.080 – rats, inbred aci
- MeSH B01.050.199.520.760.090 – rats, inbred bb
- MeSH B01.050.199.520.760.110 – rats, inbred bn
- MeSH B01.050.199.520.760.130 – rats, inbred buf
- MeSH B01.050.199.520.760.165 – rats, inbred dahl
- MeSH B01.050.199.520.760.200 – rats, inbred f344
- MeSH B01.050.199.520.760.275 – rats, inbred lec
- MeSH B01.050.199.520.760.280 – rats, inbred lew
- MeSH B01.050.199.520.760.290 – rats, inbred oletf
- MeSH B01.050.199.520.760.300 – rats, inbred shr
- MeSH B01.050.199.520.760.360 – rats, inbred wf
- MeSH B01.050.199.520.760.390 – rats, inbred wky

==== MeSH B01.050.286 – animals, poisonous ====
- MeSH B01.050.286.500 – fishes, poisonous

==== MeSH B01.050.530 – chimera ====
- MeSH B01.050.530.750 – transplantation chimera
- MeSH B01.050.530.750.760 – radiation chimera

==== MeSH B01.050.680 – organisms, genetically modified ====
- MeSH B01.050.680.136 – animals, genetically modified
- MeSH B01.050.680.136.500 – mice, transgenic
- MeSH B01.050.680.136.500.500 – mice, knockout

=== MeSH B01.150 – chordata ===
==== MeSH B01.150.200 – chordata, nonvertebrate ====
- MeSH B01.150.200.400 – hyperotreti
- MeSH B01.150.200.400.380 – hagfishes
- MeSH B01.150.200.727 – urochordata
- MeSH B01.150.200.727.300 – ciona intestinalis

==== MeSH 68014714 – vertebrates ====
- MeSH B01.150.900.090 – amphibia
- MeSH B01.150.900.090.180 – anura
- MeSH B01.150.900.090.180.210 – bufonidae
- MeSH B01.150.900.090.180.210.080 – bufo arenarum
- MeSH B01.150.900.090.180.210.108 – bufo bufo
- MeSH B01.150.900.090.180.210.580 – bufo marinus
- MeSH B01.150.900.090.180.610 – pipidae
- MeSH B01.150.900.090.180.610.500 – xenopus
- MeSH B01.150.900.090.180.610.500.562 – xenopus laevis
- MeSH B01.150.900.090.180.708 – ranidae
- MeSH B01.150.900.090.180.708.180 – rana catesbeiana
- MeSH B01.150.900.090.180.708.240 – rana esculenta
- MeSH B01.150.900.090.180.708.310 – rana pipiens
- MeSH B01.150.900.090.180.708.360 – rana ridibunda
- MeSH B01.150.900.090.180.708.420 – rana temporaria
- MeSH B01.150.900.090.608 – urodela
- MeSH B01.150.900.090.608.080 – ambystomatidae
- MeSH B01.150.900.090.608.080.068 – ambystoma
- MeSH B01.150.900.090.608.080.068.525 – ambystoma mexicanum
- MeSH B01.150.900.090.608.630 – proteidae
- MeSH B01.150.900.090.608.630.510 – necturus
- MeSH B01.150.900.090.608.630.510.508 – necturus maculosus
- MeSH B01.150.900.090.608.700 – salamandridae
- MeSH B01.150.900.090.608.700.500 – notophthalmus
- MeSH B01.150.900.090.608.700.500.480 – notophthalmus viridescens
- MeSH B01.150.900.090.608.700.540 – pleurodeles
- MeSH B01.150.900.090.608.700.610 – salamandra
- MeSH B01.150.900.090.608.700.670 – triturus
- MeSH B01.150.900.248 – birds
- MeSH B01.150.900.248.050 – anseriformes
- MeSH B01.150.900.248.050.200 – ducks
- MeSH B01.150.900.248.050.350 – geese
- MeSH B01.150.900.248.150 – charadriiformes
- MeSH B01.150.900.248.165 – columbiformes
- MeSH B01.150.900.248.165.150 – columbidae
- MeSH B01.150.900.248.250 – falconiformes
- MeSH B01.150.900.248.250.200 – eagles
- MeSH B01.150.900.248.250.400 – hawks
- MeSH B01.150.900.248.350 – galliformes
- MeSH B01.150.900.248.350.150 – chickens
- MeSH B01.150.900.248.350.650 – quail
- MeSH B01.150.900.248.350.650.300 – colinus
- MeSH B01.150.900.248.350.650.350 – coturnix
- MeSH B01.150.900.248.350.800 – turkeys
- MeSH B01.150.900.248.600 – palaeognathae
- MeSH B01.150.900.248.600.200 – dromaiidae
- MeSH B01.150.900.248.600.750 – rheiformes
- MeSH B01.150.900.248.600.800 – struthioniformes
- MeSH B01.150.900.248.617 – poultry
- MeSH B01.150.900.248.617.192 – chickens
- MeSH B01.150.900.248.617.345 – ducks
- MeSH B01.150.900.248.617.492 – geese
- MeSH B01.150.900.248.617.800 – turkeys
- MeSH B01.150.900.248.620 – passeriformes
- MeSH B01.150.900.248.620.750 – songbirds
- MeSH B01.150.900.248.620.750.150 – crows
- MeSH B01.150.900.248.620.750.250 – finches
- MeSH B01.150.900.248.620.750.250.150 – canaries
- MeSH B01.150.900.248.620.750.700 – sparrows
- MeSH B01.150.900.248.620.750.712 – starlings
- MeSH B01.150.900.248.620.750.725 – swallows
- MeSH B01.150.900.248.710 – psittaciformes
- MeSH B01.150.900.248.710.251 – cockatoos
- MeSH B01.150.900.248.710.672 – parrots
- MeSH B01.150.900.248.710.672.040 – agapornis
- MeSH B01.150.900.248.710.672.050 – amazona
- MeSH B01.150.900.248.710.672.650 – parakeets
- MeSH B01.150.900.248.710.672.650.500 – melopsittacus
- MeSH B01.150.900.248.710.672.650.650 – psittacula
- MeSH B01.150.900.248.815 – raptors
- MeSH B01.150.900.248.815.350 – falconiformes
- MeSH B01.150.900.248.815.350.200 – eagles
- MeSH B01.150.900.248.815.350.400 – hawks
- MeSH B01.150.900.248.815.550 – strigiformes
- MeSH B01.150.900.248.860 – spheniscidae
- MeSH B01.150.900.248.870 – strigiformes
- MeSH B01.150.900.493 – fishes
- MeSH B01.150.900.493.039 – batrachoidiformes
- MeSH B01.150.900.493.080 – catfishes
- MeSH B01.150.900.493.080.148 – ictaluridae
- MeSH B01.150.900.493.200 – cypriniformes
- MeSH B01.150.900.493.200.244 – cyprinidae
- MeSH B01.150.900.493.200.244.248 – carps
- MeSH B01.150.900.493.200.244.248.480 – goldfish
- MeSH B01.150.900.493.200.244.828 – zebrafish
- MeSH B01.150.900.493.338 – eels
- MeSH B01.150.900.493.338.282 – freshwater eels
- MeSH B01.150.900.493.370 – elasmobranchii
- MeSH B01.150.900.493.370.853 – sharks
- MeSH B01.150.900.493.370.853.392 – dogfish
- MeSH B01.150.900.493.370.853.392.800 – squalus
- MeSH B01.150.900.493.370.853.392.800.500 – squalus acanthias
- MeSH B01.150.900.493.370.870 – skates (fish)
- MeSH B01.150.900.493.370.935 – torpedo
- MeSH B01.150.900.493.378 – electric fish
- MeSH B01.150.900.493.378.430 – gymnotiformes
- MeSH B01.150.900.493.378.430.250 – electrophorus
- MeSH B01.150.900.493.378.682 – skates (fish)
- MeSH B01.150.900.493.378.722 – torpedo
- MeSH B01.150.900.493.385 – esociformes
- MeSH B01.150.900.493.385.300 – esocidae
- MeSH B01.150.900.493.385.850 – umbridae
- MeSH B01.150.900.493.392 – fishes, poisonous
- MeSH B01.150.900.493.418 – flatfishes
- MeSH B01.150.900.493.418.438 – flounder
- MeSH B01.150.900.493.467 – gadiformes
- MeSH B01.150.900.493.467.400 – gadus morhua
- MeSH B01.150.900.493.516 – hagfishes
- MeSH B01.150.900.493.559 – lampreys
- MeSH B01.150.900.493.559.600 – petromyzon
- MeSH B01.150.900.493.595 – osmeriformes
- MeSH B01.150.900.493.602 – perciformes
- MeSH B01.150.900.493.602.105 – bass
- MeSH B01.150.900.493.602.200 – cichlids
- MeSH B01.150.900.493.602.200.800 – tilapia
- MeSH B01.150.900.493.602.600 – perches
- MeSH B01.150.900.493.602.750 – sea bream
- MeSH B01.150.900.493.602.825 – tuna
- MeSH B01.150.900.493.817 – salmoniformes
- MeSH B01.150.900.493.817.750 – salmonidae
- MeSH B01.150.900.493.817.750.705 – salmon
- MeSH B01.150.900.493.817.750.705.580 – oncorhynchus
- MeSH B01.150.900.493.817.750.705.580.400 – oncorhynchus keta
- MeSH B01.150.900.493.817.750.705.580.410 – oncorhynchus kisutch
- MeSH B01.150.900.493.817.750.705.790 – salmo salar
- MeSH B01.150.900.493.817.750.825 – trout
- MeSH B01.150.900.493.817.750.825.580 – oncorhynchus
- MeSH B01.150.900.493.817.750.825.580.600 – oncorhynchus mykiss
- MeSH B01.150.900.493.850 – smegmamorpha
- MeSH B01.150.900.493.850.139 – beloniformes
- MeSH B01.150.900.493.850.139.650 – oryzias
- MeSH B01.150.900.493.850.280 – cyprinodontiformes
- MeSH B01.150.900.493.850.280.214 – fundulidae
- MeSH B01.150.900.493.850.280.500 – killifishes
- MeSH B01.150.900.493.850.280.680 – poecilia
- MeSH B01.150.900.493.875 – tetraodontiformes
- MeSH B01.150.900.493.875.800 – takifugu
- MeSH B01.150.900.649 – mammals
- MeSH B01.150.900.649.077 – artiodactyla
- MeSH B01.150.900.649.077.380 – ruminants
- MeSH B01.150.900.649.077.380.100 – antelopes
- MeSH B01.150.900.649.077.380.120 – bison
- MeSH B01.150.900.649.077.380.135 – buffaloes
- MeSH B01.150.900.649.077.380.175 – camelids, new world
- MeSH B01.150.900.649.077.380.201 – camels
- MeSH B01.150.900.649.077.380.271 – cattle
- MeSH B01.150.900.649.077.380.373 – deer
- MeSH B01.150.900.649.077.380.373.322 – muntjacs
- MeSH B01.150.900.649.077.380.373.644 – reindeer
- MeSH B01.150.900.649.077.380.513 – goats
- MeSH B01.150.900.649.077.380.513.500 – rupicapra
- MeSH B01.150.900.649.077.380.791 – sheep
- MeSH B01.150.900.649.077.380.791.100 – sheep, bighorn
- MeSH B01.150.900.649.077.380.791.150 – sheep, domestic
- MeSH B01.150.900.649.077.880 – swine
- MeSH B01.150.900.649.077.880.399 – sus scrofa
- MeSH B01.150.900.649.077.880.800 – swine, miniature
- MeSH B01.150.900.649.147 – carnivora
- MeSH B01.150.900.649.147.153 – canidae
- MeSH B01.150.900.649.147.153.150 – coyotes
- MeSH B01.150.900.649.147.153.200 – dogs
- MeSH B01.150.900.649.147.153.250 – foxes
- MeSH B01.150.900.649.147.153.400 – jackals
- MeSH B01.150.900.649.147.153.700 – raccoon dogs
- MeSH B01.150.900.649.147.153.900 – wolves
- MeSH B01.150.900.649.147.354 – felidae
- MeSH B01.150.900.649.147.354.030 – acinonyx
- MeSH B01.150.900.649.147.354.250 – felis
- MeSH B01.150.900.649.147.354.250.125 – cats
- MeSH B01.150.900.649.147.354.500 – lynx
- MeSH B01.150.900.649.147.354.600 – panthera
- MeSH B01.150.900.649.147.354.600.500 – lions
- MeSH B01.150.900.649.147.354.600.800 – tigers
- MeSH B01.150.900.649.147.354.630 – puma
- MeSH B01.150.900.649.147.400 – herpestidae
- MeSH B01.150.900.649.147.410 – hyaenidae
- MeSH B01.150.900.649.147.500 – mephitidae
- MeSH B01.150.900.649.147.550 – mustelidae
- MeSH B01.150.900.649.147.550.350 – ferrets
- MeSH B01.150.900.649.147.550.500 – mink
- MeSH B01.150.900.649.147.550.600 – otters
- MeSH B01.150.900.649.147.600 – pinnipedia
- MeSH B01.150.900.649.147.600.288 – fur seals
- MeSH B01.150.900.649.147.600.670 – sea lions
- MeSH B01.150.900.649.147.600.700 – seals, earless
- MeSH B01.150.900.649.147.600.700.600 – phoca
- MeSH B01.150.900.649.147.600.821 – walruses
- MeSH B01.150.900.649.147.650 – procyonidae
- MeSH B01.150.900.649.147.650.700 – raccoons
- MeSH B01.150.900.649.147.890 – ursidae
- MeSH B01.150.900.649.147.900 – viverridae
- MeSH B01.150.900.649.189 – cetacea
- MeSH B01.150.900.649.189.267 – dolphins
- MeSH B01.150.900.649.189.267.100 – bottle-nosed dolphin
- MeSH B01.150.900.649.189.267.150 – common dolphins
- MeSH B01.150.900.649.189.267.750 – stenella
- MeSH B01.150.900.649.189.267.900 – whale, killer
- MeSH B01.150.900.649.189.267.920 – whales, pilot
- MeSH B01.150.900.649.189.566 – porpoises
- MeSH B01.150.900.649.189.566.600 – phocoena
- MeSH B01.150.900.649.189.865 – whales
- MeSH B01.150.900.649.189.865.100 – balaenoptera
- MeSH B01.150.900.649.189.865.100.350 – fin whale
- MeSH B01.150.900.649.189.865.100.500 – minke whale
- MeSH B01.150.900.649.189.865.110 – beluga whale
- MeSH B01.150.900.649.189.865.130 – bowhead whale
- MeSH B01.150.900.649.189.865.400 – humpback whale
- MeSH B01.150.900.649.189.865.750 – sperm whale
- MeSH B01.150.900.649.225 – chiroptera
- MeSH B01.150.900.649.352 – elephants
- MeSH B01.150.900.649.400 – hyraxes
- MeSH B01.150.900.649.473 – insectivora
- MeSH B01.150.900.649.473.376 – hedgehogs
- MeSH B01.150.900.649.473.450 – moles
- MeSH B01.150.900.649.473.751 – shrews
- MeSH B01.150.900.649.521 – lagomorpha
- MeSH 68034621 – hares
- MeSH 68011817 – rabbits
- MeSH B01.150.900.649.573 – marsupialia
- MeSH B01.150.900.649.573.500 – macropodidae
- MeSH B01.150.900.649.573.575 – opossums
- MeSH B01.150.900.649.573.575.150 – didelphis
- MeSH B01.150.900.649.573.575.500 – monodelphis
- MeSH B01.150.900.649.573.587 – phalangeridae
- MeSH B01.150.900.649.573.587.800 – trichosurus
- MeSH B01.150.900.649.573.590 – phascolarctidae
- MeSH B01.150.900.649.573.600 – potoroidae
- MeSH B01.150.900.649.627 – monotremata
- MeSH B01.150.900.649.627.300 – echidna
- MeSH B01.150.900.649.627.600 – platypus
- MeSH B01.150.900.649.709 – perissodactyla
- MeSH B01.150.900.649.709.235 – equidae
- MeSH B01.150.900.649.709.235.472 – horses
- MeSH B01.150.900.649.801 – primates
- MeSH B01.150.900.649.801.400 – haplorhini
- MeSH B01.150.900.649.801.400.112 – catarrhini
- MeSH B01.150.900.649.801.400.112.199 – cercopithecidae
- MeSH B01.150.900.649.801.400.112.199.120 – cercopithecinae
- MeSH B01.150.900.649.801.400.112.199.120.120 – cercocebus
- MeSH B01.150.900.649.801.400.112.199.120.120.110 – cercocebus atys
- MeSH B01.150.900.649.801.400.112.199.120.126 – cercopithecus
- MeSH B01.150.900.649.801.400.112.199.120.126.110 – cercopithecus aethiops
- MeSH B01.150.900.649.801.400.112.199.120.260 – erythrocebus
- MeSH B01.150.900.649.801.400.112.199.120.260.260 – erythrocebus patas
- MeSH B01.150.900.649.801.400.112.199.120.510 – macaca
- MeSH B01.150.900.649.801.400.112.199.120.510.520 – macaca fascicularis
- MeSH B01.150.900.649.801.400.112.199.120.510.550 – macaca mulatta
- MeSH B01.150.900.649.801.400.112.199.120.510.560 – macaca nemestrina
- MeSH B01.150.900.649.801.400.112.199.120.510.570 – macaca radiata
- MeSH B01.150.900.649.801.400.112.199.120.530 – mandrillus
- MeSH B01.150.900.649.801.400.112.199.120.610 – papio
- MeSH B01.150.900.649.801.400.112.199.120.610.050 – papio anubis
- MeSH B01.150.900.649.801.400.112.199.120.610.150 – papio cynocephalus
- MeSH B01.150.900.649.801.400.112.199.120.610.400 – papio hamadryas
- MeSH B01.150.900.649.801.400.112.199.120.610.600 – papio papio
- MeSH B01.150.900.649.801.400.112.199.120.610.800 – papio ursinus
- MeSH B01.150.900.649.801.400.112.199.120.730 – theropithecus
- MeSH B01.150.900.649.801.400.112.199.150 – colobinae
- MeSH B01.150.900.649.801.400.112.199.150.150 – colobus
- MeSH B01.150.900.649.801.400.112.400 – hominidae
- MeSH B01.150.900.649.801.400.112.400.375 – gorilla gorilla
- MeSH B01.150.900.649.801.400.112.400.400 – humans
- MeSH B01.150.900.649.801.400.112.400.600 – pan paniscus
- MeSH B01.150.900.649.801.400.112.400.620 – pan troglodytes
- MeSH B01.150.900.649.801.400.112.400.650 – pongo pygmaeus
- MeSH B01.150.900.649.801.400.112.420 – hylobatidae
- MeSH B01.150.900.649.801.400.112.420.390 – hylobates
- MeSH B01.150.900.649.801.400.600 – platyrrhini
- MeSH B01.150.900.649.801.400.600.075 – atelidae
- MeSH B01.150.900.649.801.400.600.130 – callitrichidae
- MeSH B01.150.900.649.801.400.600.130.105 – callimico
- MeSH B01.150.900.649.801.400.600.130.114 – callithrix
- MeSH B01.150.900.649.801.400.600.130.450 – leontopithecus
- MeSH B01.150.900.649.801.400.600.130.710 – saguinus
- MeSH B01.150.900.649.801.400.600.150 – cebidae
- MeSH B01.150.900.649.801.400.600.150.075 – alouattinae
- MeSH B01.150.900.649.801.400.600.150.075.075 – alouatta
- MeSH B01.150.900.649.801.400.600.150.092 – aotinae
- MeSH B01.150.900.649.801.400.600.150.092.092 – aotus trivirgatus
- MeSH B01.150.900.649.801.400.600.150.120 – cebinae
- MeSH B01.150.900.649.801.400.600.150.120.120 – cebus
- MeSH B01.150.900.649.801.400.600.150.710 – saimirinae
- MeSH B01.150.900.649.801.400.600.150.710.710 – saimiri
- MeSH B01.150.900.649.801.400.800 – tarsii
- MeSH B01.150.900.649.801.400.800.500 – tarsiidae
- MeSH B01.150.900.649.801.700 – strepsirhini
- MeSH B01.150.900.649.801.700.200 – cheirogaleidae
- MeSH B01.150.900.649.801.700.508 – lemuridae
- MeSH B01.150.900.649.801.700.508.490 – lemur
- MeSH B01.150.900.649.801.700.572 – lorisidae
- MeSH B01.150.900.649.801.700.572.408 – galago
- MeSH B01.150.900.649.865 – rodentia
- MeSH B01.150.900.649.865.328 – chinchilla
- MeSH B01.150.900.649.865.510 – dipodomys
- MeSH B01.150.900.649.865.545 – gophers
- MeSH B01.150.900.649.865.550 – guinea pigs
- MeSH B01.150.900.649.865.600 – mole rats
- MeSH B01.150.900.649.865.600.700 – spalax
- MeSH B01.150.900.649.865.635 – muridae
- MeSH B01.150.900.649.865.635.070 – arvicolinae
- MeSH B01.150.900.649.865.635.150 – cricetinae
- MeSH B01.150.900.649.865.635.150.250 – cricetulus
- MeSH B01.150.900.649.865.635.150.500 – mesocricetus
- MeSH B01.150.900.649.865.635.150.630 – phodopus
- MeSH B01.150.900.649.865.635.300 – gerbillinae
- MeSH B01.150.900.649.865.635.505 – murinae
- MeSH B01.150.900.649.865.635.505.500 – mice
- MeSH B01.150.900.649.865.635.505.500.150 – mice, congenic
- MeSH B01.150.900.649.865.635.505.500.400 – mice, inbred strains
- MeSH B01.150.900.649.865.635.505.500.400.300 – mice, inbred a
- MeSH B01.150.900.649.865.635.505.500.400.318 – mice, inbred akr
- MeSH B01.150.900.649.865.635.505.500.400.338 – mice, inbred balb c
- MeSH B01.150.900.649.865.635.505.500.400.388 – mice, inbred c3h
- MeSH B01.150.900.649.865.635.505.500.400.420 – mice, inbred c57bl
- MeSH B01.150.900.649.865.635.505.500.400.420.500 – mice, inbred mdx
- MeSH B01.150.900.649.865.635.505.500.400.440 – mice, inbred cba
- MeSH B01.150.900.649.865.635.505.500.400.445 – mice, inbred cftr
- MeSH B01.150.900.649.865.635.505.500.400.460 – mice, inbred dba
- MeSH B01.150.900.649.865.635.505.500.400.480 – mice, inbred hrs
- MeSH B01.150.900.649.865.635.505.500.400.510 – mice, inbred icr
- MeSH B01.150.900.649.865.635.505.500.400.555 – mice, inbred mrl lpr
- MeSH B01.150.900.649.865.635.505.500.400.565 – mice, inbred nod
- MeSH B01.150.900.649.865.635.505.500.400.580 – mice, inbred nzb
- MeSH B01.150.900.649.865.635.505.500.400.600 – mice, inbred sencar
- MeSH B01.150.900.649.865.635.505.500.550 – mice, mutant strains
- MeSH B01.150.900.649.865.635.505.500.550.100 – mice, biozzi
- MeSH B01.150.900.649.865.635.505.500.550.265 – mice, inbred mdx
- MeSH B01.150.900.649.865.635.505.500.550.430 – mice, jimpy
- MeSH B01.150.900.649.865.635.505.500.550.455 – Knockout mice|mice, knockout
- MeSH B01.150.900.649.865.635.505.500.550.480 – mice, neurologic mutants
- MeSH B01.150.900.649.865.635.505.500.550.500 – mice, nude
- MeSH B01.150.900.649.865.635.505.500.550.530 – mice, obese
- MeSH B01.150.900.649.865.635.505.500.550.560 – mice, quaking
- MeSH B01.150.900.649.865.635.505.500.550.780 – mice, scid
- MeSH B01.150.900.649.865.635.505.500.800 – mice, transgenic
- MeSH B01.150.900.649.865.635.505.500.800.500 – mice, knockout
- MeSH B01.150.900.649.865.635.505.700 – rats
- MeSH B01.150.900.649.865.635.505.700.400 – rats, inbred strains
- MeSH B01.150.900.649.865.635.505.700.400.080 – rats, inbred aci
- MeSH B01.150.900.649.865.635.505.700.400.090 – rats, inbred bb
- MeSH B01.150.900.649.865.635.505.700.400.110 – rats, inbred bn
- MeSH B01.150.900.649.865.635.505.700.400.130 – rats, inbred buf
- MeSH B01.150.900.649.865.635.505.700.400.165 – rats, inbred dahl
- MeSH B01.150.900.649.865.635.505.700.400.200 – rats, inbred f344
- MeSH B01.150.900.649.865.635.505.700.400.275 – rats, inbred lec
- MeSH B01.150.900.649.865.635.505.700.400.280 – rats, inbred lew
- MeSH B01.150.900.649.865.635.505.700.400.290 – rats, inbred oletf
- MeSH B01.150.900.649.865.635.505.700.400.300 – rats, inbred shr
- MeSH B01.150.900.649.865.635.505.700.400.360 – rats, inbred wf
- MeSH B01.150.900.649.865.635.505.700.400.390 – rats, inbred wky
- MeSH B01.150.900.649.865.635.505.700.500 – rats, long-evans
- MeSH B01.150.900.649.865.635.505.700.550 – rats, mutant strains
- MeSH B01.150.900.649.865.635.505.700.550.110 – rats, brattleboro
- MeSH B01.150.900.649.865.635.505.700.550.308 – rats, gunn
- MeSH B01.150.900.649.865.635.505.700.550.508 – rats, nude
- MeSH B01.150.900.649.865.635.505.700.550.700 – rats, zucker
- MeSH B01.150.900.649.865.635.505.700.750 – rats, sprague-dawley
- MeSH B01.150.900.649.865.635.505.700.900 – rats, wistar
- MeSH B01.150.900.649.865.635.680 – sigmodontinae
- MeSH B01.150.900.649.865.635.680.510 – peromyscus
- MeSH B01.150.900.649.865.635.700 – spalax
- MeSH B01.150.900.649.865.640 – myoxidae
- MeSH B01.150.900.649.865.663 – octodon
- MeSH B01.150.900.649.865.692 – porcupines
- MeSH B01.150.900.649.865.750 – sciuridae
- MeSH B01.150.900.649.865.750.460 – marmota
- MeSH B01.150.900.649.875 – scandentia
- MeSH B01.150.900.649.875.770 – tupaiidae
- MeSH B01.150.900.649.875.770.770 – tupaia
- MeSH B01.150.900.649.879 – sirenia
- MeSH B01.150.900.649.879.125 – dugong
- MeSH B01.150.900.649.879.750 – trichechus
- MeSH B01.150.900.649.879.750.350 – trichechus inunguis
- MeSH B01.150.900.649.879.750.500 – trichechus manatus
- MeSH B01.150.900.649.900 – xenarthra
- MeSH B01.150.900.649.900.200 – armadillos
- MeSH B01.150.900.649.900.750 – sloths
- MeSH B01.150.900.833 – reptiles
- MeSH B01.150.900.833.100 – alligators and crocodiles
- MeSH B01.150.900.833.150 – dinosaurs
- MeSH B01.150.900.833.393 – lizards
- MeSH B01.150.900.833.393.500 – iguanas
- MeSH B01.150.900.833.672 – snakes
- MeSH B01.150.900.833.672.250 – boidae
- MeSH B01.150.900.833.672.280 – colubridae
- MeSH B01.150.900.833.672.350 – elapidae
- MeSH B01.150.900.833.672.350.225 – bungarus
- MeSH B01.150.900.833.672.350.275 – cobra
- MeSH B01.150.900.833.672.400 – hydrophiidae
- MeSH B01.150.900.833.672.875 – viperidae
- MeSH B01.150.900.833.672.875.120 – agkistrodon
- MeSH B01.150.900.833.672.875.200 – bothrops
- MeSH B01.150.900.833.672.875.280 – crotalus
- MeSH B01.150.900.833.672.875.750 – russell's viper
- MeSH B01.150.900.833.672.875.875 – trimeresurus
- MeSH B01.150.900.833.848 – turtles

=== MeSH B01.500 – invertebrates ===
==== MeSH B01.500.091 – annelida ====
- MeSH B01.500.091.426 – leeches
- MeSH B01.500.091.426.400 – hirudo medicinalis
- MeSH B01.500.091.657 – oligochaeta
- MeSH B01.500.091.700 – polychaeta

==== MeSH B01.500.131 – arthropods ====
- MeSH B01.500.131.166 – arachnida
- MeSH B01.500.131.166.132 – acari
- MeSH B01.500.131.166.132.419 – mites
- MeSH B01.500.131.166.132.419.050 – acaridae
- MeSH B01.500.131.166.132.419.575 – psoroptidae
- MeSH B01.500.131.166.132.419.600 – pyroglyphidae
- MeSH B01.500.131.166.132.419.600.200 – dermatophagoides farinae
- MeSH B01.500.131.166.132.419.600.215 – dermatophagoides pteronyssinus
- MeSH B01.500.131.166.132.419.750 – sarcoptidae
- MeSH B01.500.131.166.132.419.750.800 – sarcoptes scabiei
- MeSH B01.500.131.166.132.419.850 – tetranychidae
- MeSH B01.500.131.166.132.419.875 – trombiculidae
- MeSH B01.500.131.166.132.832 – ticks
- MeSH B01.500.131.166.132.832.100 – argasidae
- MeSH B01.500.131.166.132.832.100.100 – argas
- MeSH B01.500.131.166.132.832.100.700 – ornithodoros
- MeSH B01.500.131.166.132.832.400 – ixodidae
- MeSH B01.500.131.166.132.832.400.200 – dermacentor
- MeSH B01.500.131.166.132.832.400.425 – ixodes
- MeSH B01.500.131.166.132.832.400.712 – rhipicephalus
- MeSH B01.500.131.166.132.832.400.712.700 – rhipicephalus sanguineus
- MeSH B01.500.131.166.661 – scorpions
- MeSH B01.500.131.166.803 – spiders
- MeSH B01.500.131.166.803.200 – black widow spider
- MeSH B01.500.131.365 – crustacea
- MeSH B01.500.131.365.055 – amphipoda
- MeSH B01.500.131.365.060 – anostraca
- MeSH B01.500.131.365.060.050 – artemia
- MeSH B01.500.131.365.070 – arguloida
- MeSH B01.500.131.365.150 – cladocera
- MeSH B01.500.131.365.150.200 – daphnia
- MeSH B01.500.131.365.160 – copepoda
- MeSH B01.500.131.365.190 – decapoda (crustacea)
- MeSH B01.500.131.365.190.050 – anomura
- MeSH B01.500.131.365.190.070 – astacoidea
- MeSH B01.500.131.365.190.110 – brachyura
- MeSH B01.500.131.365.190.150 – crangonidae
- MeSH B01.500.131.365.190.550 – nephropidae
- MeSH B01.500.131.365.190.615 – palaemonidae
- MeSH B01.500.131.365.190.625 – palinuridae
- MeSH B01.500.131.365.190.635 – pandalidae
- MeSH B01.500.131.365.190.660 – penaeidae
- MeSH B01.500.131.365.250 – euphausiacea
- MeSH B01.500.131.365.400 – isopoda
- MeSH B01.500.131.365.880 – thoracica
- MeSH B01.500.131.450 – horseshoe crabs
- MeSH B01.500.131.617 – insects
- MeSH B01.500.131.617.069 – beetles
- MeSH B01.500.131.617.069.307 – fireflies
- MeSH B01.500.131.617.069.615 – tenebrio
- MeSH B01.500.131.617.069.799 – tribolium
- MeSH B01.500.131.617.069.900 – weevils
- MeSH B01.500.131.617.140 – cockroaches
- MeSH B01.500.131.617.140.100 – blattellidae
- MeSH B01.500.131.617.140.580 – periplaneta
- MeSH B01.500.131.617.289 – diptera
- MeSH B01.500.131.617.289.208 – ceratopogonidae
- MeSH B01.500.131.617.289.260 – chironomidae
- MeSH B01.500.131.617.289.275 – culicidae
- MeSH B01.500.131.617.289.275.100 – aedes
- MeSH B01.500.131.617.289.275.120 – anopheles
- MeSH B01.500.131.617.289.275.120.400 – anopheles gambiae
- MeSH B01.500.131.617.289.275.225 – culex
- MeSH B01.500.131.617.289.275.612 – ochlerotatus
- MeSH B01.500.131.617.289.310 – drosophilidae
- MeSH B01.500.131.617.289.310.250 – drosophila
- MeSH B01.500.131.617.289.310.250.500 – drosophila melanogaster
- MeSH B01.500.131.617.289.400 – glossinidae
- MeSH B01.500.131.617.289.400.700 – tsetse flies
- MeSH B01.500.131.617.289.642 – muscidae
- MeSH B01.500.131.617.289.642.470 – houseflies
- MeSH B01.500.131.617.289.781 – psychodidae
- MeSH B01.500.131.617.289.781.602 – phlebotomus
- MeSH B01.500.131.617.289.800 – simuliidae
- MeSH B01.500.131.617.289.850 – tephritidae
- MeSH B01.500.131.617.289.850.150 – ceratitis capitata
- MeSH B01.500.131.617.364 – fleas
- MeSH B01.500.131.617.412 – hemiptera
- MeSH B01.500.131.617.412.165 – aphids
- MeSH B01.500.131.617.412.420 – heteroptera
- MeSH B01.500.131.617.412.420.150 – cimicidae
- MeSH B01.500.131.617.412.420.150.100 – bedbugs
- MeSH B01.500.131.617.412.420.700 – reduviidae
- MeSH B01.500.131.617.412.420.700.850 – triatominae
- MeSH B01.500.131.617.412.420.700.850.600 – panstrongylus
- MeSH B01.500.131.617.412.420.700.850.700 – rhodnius
- MeSH B01.500.131.617.412.420.700.850.800 – triatoma
- MeSH B01.500.131.617.479 – hymenoptera
- MeSH B01.500.131.617.479.205 – ants
- MeSH B01.500.131.617.479.387 – bees
- MeSH B01.500.131.617.479.900 – wasps
- MeSH B01.500.131.617.485 – isoptera
- MeSH B01.500.131.617.561 – lepidoptera
- MeSH B01.500.131.617.561.200 – butterflies
- MeSH B01.500.131.617.561.650 – moths
- MeSH B01.500.131.617.561.650.100 – bombyx
- MeSH B01.500.131.617.561.650.525 – manduca
- MeSH B01.500.131.617.561.650.700 – spodoptera
- MeSH B01.500.131.617.564 – lice
- MeSH B01.500.131.617.564.159 – anoplura
- MeSH B01.500.131.617.564.159.716 – pediculus
- MeSH B01.500.131.617.564.159.730 – phthirus
- MeSH B01.500.131.617.564.524 – mallophaga
- MeSH B01.500.131.617.590 – mantodea
- MeSH B01.500.131.617.678 – orthoptera
- MeSH B01.500.131.617.678.369 – grasshoppers
- MeSH B01.500.131.617.678.369.500 – locusta migratoria
- MeSH B01.500.131.617.678.410 – gryllidae

==== MeSH B01.500.272 – chordata, nonvertebrate ====
- MeSH B01.500.272.400 – hyperotreti
- MeSH B01.500.272.400.380 – hagfishes
- MeSH B01.500.272.727 – urochordata
- MeSH B01.500.272.727.300 – ciona intestinalis

==== MeSH B01.500.308 – cnidaria ====
- MeSH B01.500.308.237 – anthozoa
- MeSH B01.500.308.237.700 – renilla
- MeSH B01.500.308.237.750 – sea anemones
- MeSH B01.500.308.361 – cubozoa
- MeSH B01.500.308.485 – hydrozoa
- MeSH B01.500.308.485.400 – hydra
- MeSH B01.500.308.690 – scyphozoa
- MeSH B01.500.308.690.750 – sea nettle, east coast

==== MeSH B01.500.408 – echinodermata ====
- MeSH B01.500.408.560 – sea cucumbers
- MeSH B01.500.408.560.150 – cucumaria
- MeSH B01.500.408.560.400 – holothuria
- MeSH B01.500.408.560.700 – stichopus
- MeSH B01.500.408.578 – sea urchins
- MeSH B01.500.408.578.050 – anthocidaris
- MeSH B01.500.408.578.070 – arbacia
- MeSH B01.500.408.578.400 – hemicentrotus
- MeSH B01.500.408.578.500 – lytechnius
- MeSH B01.500.408.578.600 – paracentrotus
- MeSH B01.500.408.578.800 – strongylocentrotus
- MeSH B01.500.408.578.800.600 – strongylocentrotus purpuratus
- MeSH B01.500.408.765 – starfish
- MeSH B01.500.408.765.070 – asterias
- MeSH B01.500.408.765.075 – asterina

==== MeSH B01.500.500 – helminths ====
- MeSH B01.500.500.132 – acanthocephala
- MeSH B01.500.500.132.546 – moniliformis
- MeSH B01.500.500.294 – nematoda
- MeSH B01.500.500.294.100 – adenophorea
- MeSH B01.500.500.294.100.275 – enoplida
- MeSH B01.500.500.294.100.275.200 – dioctophymatoidea
- MeSH B01.500.500.294.100.275.570 – mermithoidea
- MeSH B01.500.500.294.100.275.780 – trichuroidea
- MeSH B01.500.500.294.100.275.780.180 – capillaria
- MeSH B01.500.500.294.100.275.780.608 – trichinella
- MeSH B01.500.500.294.100.275.780.608.700 – trichinella spiralis
- MeSH B01.500.500.294.100.275.780.628 – trichuris
- MeSH B01.500.500.294.700 – secernentea
- MeSH B01.500.500.294.700.100 – ascaridida
- MeSH B01.500.500.294.700.100.100 – ascaridoidea
- MeSH B01.500.500.294.700.100.100.075 – anisakis
- MeSH B01.500.500.294.700.100.100.082 – ascaridia
- MeSH B01.500.500.294.700.100.100.108 – ascaris
- MeSH B01.500.500.294.700.100.100.108.425 – ascaris lumbricoides
- MeSH B01.500.500.294.700.100.100.108.700 – ascaris suum
- MeSH B01.500.500.294.700.100.100.700 – toxascaris
- MeSH B01.500.500.294.700.100.100.780 – toxocara
- MeSH B01.500.500.294.700.100.100.780.225 – toxocara canis
- MeSH B01.500.500.294.700.500 – oxyurida
- MeSH B01.500.500.294.700.500.500 – oxyuroidea
- MeSH B01.500.500.294.700.500.500.308 – enterobius
- MeSH B01.500.500.294.700.700 – rhabditida
- MeSH B01.500.500.294.700.700.640 – rhabdiasoidea
- MeSH B01.500.500.294.700.700.640.680 – strongyloides
- MeSH B01.500.500.294.700.700.640.680.600 – strongyloides ratti
- MeSH B01.500.500.294.700.700.640.680.700 – strongyloides stercoralis
- MeSH B01.500.500.294.700.700.660 – rhabditoidea
- MeSH B01.500.500.294.700.700.660.250 – caenorhabditis
- MeSH B01.500.500.294.700.700.660.250.250 – caenorhabditis elegans
- MeSH B01.500.500.294.700.750 – spirurida
- MeSH B01.500.500.294.700.750.225 – camallanina
- MeSH B01.500.500.294.700.750.225.250 – dracunculoidea
- MeSH B01.500.500.294.700.750.225.250.250 – dracunculus nematode
- MeSH B01.500.500.294.700.750.700 – spirurina
- MeSH B01.500.500.294.700.750.700.300 – filarioidea
- MeSH B01.500.500.294.700.750.700.300.088 – brugia
- MeSH B01.500.500.294.700.750.700.300.088.500 – brugia malayi
- MeSH B01.500.500.294.700.750.700.300.088.550 – brugia pahangi
- MeSH B01.500.500.294.700.750.700.300.208 – dipetalonema
- MeSH B01.500.500.294.700.750.700.300.230 – dirofilaria
- MeSH B01.500.500.294.700.750.700.300.230.300 – dirofilaria immitis
- MeSH B01.500.500.294.700.750.700.300.410 – loa
- MeSH B01.500.500.294.700.750.700.300.438 – mansonella
- MeSH B01.500.500.294.700.750.700.300.470 – microfilaria
- MeSH B01.500.500.294.700.750.700.300.510 – onchocerca
- MeSH B01.500.500.294.700.750.700.300.510.850 – onchocerca volvulus
- MeSH B01.500.500.294.700.750.700.300.700 – setaria nematode
- MeSH B01.500.500.294.700.750.700.300.708 – wuchereria
- MeSH B01.500.500.294.700.750.700.300.708.150 – wuchereria bancrofti
- MeSH B01.500.500.294.700.750.700.680 – spiruroidea
- MeSH B01.500.500.294.700.750.700.722 – thelazioidea
- MeSH B01.500.500.294.700.750.700.722.375 – gnathostoma
- MeSH B01.500.500.294.700.775 – strongylida
- MeSH B01.500.500.294.700.775.100 – ancylostomatoidea
- MeSH B01.500.500.294.700.775.100.100 – ancylostoma
- MeSH B01.500.500.294.700.775.100.550 – necator
- MeSH B01.500.500.294.700.775.100.550.100 – necator americanus
- MeSH B01.500.500.294.700.775.400 – heligmosomatoidea
- MeSH B01.500.500.294.700.775.400.550 – nematospiroides
- MeSH B01.500.500.294.700.775.400.550.275 – nematospiroides dubius
- MeSH B01.500.500.294.700.775.400.575 – nippostrongylus
- MeSH B01.500.500.294.700.775.588 – metastrongyloidea
- MeSH B01.500.500.294.700.775.588.080 – angiostrongylus
- MeSH B01.500.500.294.700.775.588.080.225 – angiostrongylus cantonensis
- MeSH B01.500.500.294.700.775.710 – strongyloidea
- MeSH B01.500.500.294.700.775.710.600 – oesophagostomum
- MeSH B01.500.500.294.700.775.710.700 – strongylus
- MeSH B01.500.500.294.700.775.746 – trichostrongyloidea
- MeSH B01.500.500.294.700.775.746.300 – dictyocaulus
- MeSH B01.500.500.294.700.775.746.410 – haemonchus
- MeSH B01.500.500.294.700.775.746.432 – ostertagia
- MeSH B01.500.500.294.700.775.746.610 – trichostrongylus
- MeSH B01.500.500.294.700.825 – tylenchida
- MeSH B01.500.500.294.700.825.825 – tylenchoidea
- MeSH B01.500.500.736 – platyhelminths
- MeSH B01.500.500.736.215 – cestoda
- MeSH B01.500.500.736.215.228 – diphyllobothrium
- MeSH B01.500.500.736.215.228.831 – sparganum
- MeSH B01.500.500.736.215.327 – echinococcus
- MeSH B01.500.500.736.215.327.400 – echinococcus granulosus
- MeSH B01.500.500.736.215.327.500 – echinococcus multilocularis
- MeSH B01.500.500.736.215.454 – hymenolepis
- MeSH B01.500.500.736.215.454.400 – hymenolepis diminuta
- MeSH B01.500.500.736.215.454.410 – hymenolepis nana
- MeSH B01.500.500.736.215.520 – mesocestoides
- MeSH B01.500.500.736.215.800 – spirometra
- MeSH B01.500.500.736.215.800.810 – sparganum
- MeSH B01.500.500.736.215.895 – taenia
- MeSH B01.500.500.736.215.895.286 – cysticercus
- MeSH B01.500.500.736.215.895.643 – taenia saginata
- MeSH B01.500.500.736.215.895.775 – taenia solium
- MeSH B01.500.500.736.715 – trematoda
- MeSH B01.500.500.736.715.300 – dicrocoeliidae
- MeSH B01.500.500.736.715.300.308 – dicrocoelium
- MeSH B01.500.500.736.715.360 – echinostomatidae
- MeSH B01.500.500.736.715.360.310 – echinostoma
- MeSH B01.500.500.736.715.408 – fasciolidae
- MeSH B01.500.500.736.715.408.380 – fasciola
- MeSH B01.500.500.736.715.408.380.420 – fasciola hepatica
- MeSH B01.500.500.736.715.465 – heterophyidae
- MeSH B01.500.500.736.715.520 – opisthorchidae
- MeSH B01.500.500.736.715.520.210 – clonorchis sinensis
- MeSH B01.500.500.736.715.520.700 – opisthorchis
- MeSH B01.500.500.736.715.600 – paramphistomatidae
- MeSH B01.500.500.736.715.770 – schistosomatidae
- MeSH B01.500.500.736.715.770.680 – schistosoma
- MeSH B01.500.500.736.715.770.680.510 – schistosoma haematobium
- MeSH B01.500.500.736.715.770.680.570 – schistosoma japonicum
- MeSH B01.500.500.736.715.770.680.700 – schistosoma mansoni
- MeSH B01.500.500.736.715.800 – troglotrematidae
- MeSH B01.500.500.736.715.800.610 – paragonimus
- MeSH B01.500.500.736.715.800.610.900 – paragonimus westermani
- MeSH B01.500.500.736.847 – turbellaria
- MeSH B01.500.500.736.847.610 – planarians
- MeSH B01.500.500.770 – rotifera

==== MeSH B01.500.644 – mollusca ====
- MeSH B01.500.644.080 – bivalvia
- MeSH B01.500.644.080.050 – arcidae
- MeSH B01.500.644.080.050.700 – scapharca
- MeSH B01.500.644.080.150 – cardiidae
- MeSH B01.500.644.080.175 – corbicula
- MeSH B01.500.644.080.225 – dreissena
- MeSH B01.500.644.080.500 – mercenaria
- MeSH B01.500.644.080.535 – mya
- MeSH B01.500.644.080.537 – mytilidae
- MeSH B01.500.644.080.537.500 – mytilus
- MeSH B01.500.644.080.537.500.500 – mytilus edulis
- MeSH B01.500.644.080.537.600 – perna
- MeSH B01.500.644.080.643 – ostreidae
- MeSH B01.500.644.080.643.150 – crassostrea
- MeSH B01.500.644.080.643.600 – ostrea
- MeSH B01.500.644.080.660 – pectinidae
- MeSH B01.500.644.080.660.600 – pecten
- MeSH B01.500.644.080.670 – pinctada
- MeSH B01.500.644.080.750 – spisula
- MeSH B01.500.644.080.850 – unionidae
- MeSH B01.500.644.080.850.050 – anodonta
- MeSH B01.500.644.080.850.850 – unio
- MeSH B01.500.644.116 – cephalopoda
- MeSH B01.500.644.116.150 – decapodiformes
- MeSH B01.500.644.116.150.500 – loligo
- MeSH B01.500.644.116.150.700 – sepia
- MeSH B01.500.644.116.550 – nautilus
- MeSH B01.500.644.116.600 – octopodiformes
- MeSH B01.500.644.400 – gastropoda
- MeSH B01.500.644.400.060 – aplysia
- MeSH B01.500.644.400.150 – clione
- MeSH B01.500.644.400.275 – conus snail
- MeSH B01.500.644.400.400 – hermissenda
- MeSH B01.500.644.400.600 – pleurobranchaea
- MeSH B01.500.644.400.750 – snails
- MeSH B01.500.644.400.750.185 – biomphalaria
- MeSH B01.500.644.400.750.323 – bulinus
- MeSH B01.500.644.400.750.450 – helix (snails)
- MeSH B01.500.644.400.750.645 – lymnaea
- MeSH B01.500.644.400.800 – tritonia sea slug
- MeSH B01.500.644.600 – polyplacophora

==== MeSH B01.500.766 – plankton ====
- MeSH B01.500.766.743 – zooplankton

==== MeSH B01.500.802 – porifera ====
- MeSH B01.500.802.039 – agelas
- MeSH B01.500.802.080 – axinella
- MeSH B01.500.802.160 – callyspongia
- MeSH B01.500.802.175 – crambe sponge
- MeSH B01.500.802.200 – dysidea
- MeSH B01.500.802.360 – geodia
- MeSH B01.500.802.380 – haliclona
- MeSH B01.500.802.650 –petrosia
- MeSH B01.500.802.670 – plakortis
- MeSH B01.500.802.775 – suberites
- MeSH B01.500.802.785 – theonella
- MeSH B01.500.802.900 – xestospongia

==== MeSH B01.500.841 – protozoa ====
- MeSH B01.500.841.075 – apicomplexa
- MeSH B01.500.841.075.189 – coccidia
- MeSH B01.500.841.075.189.250 – eimeriida
- MeSH B01.500.841.075.189.250.150 – cryptosporidiidae
- MeSH B01.500.841.075.189.250.150.160 – cryptosporidium
- MeSH B01.500.841.075.189.250.150.160.170 – cryptosporidium parvum
- MeSH B01.500.841.075.189.250.250 – eimeriidae
- MeSH B01.500.841.075.189.250.250.200 – cyclospora
- MeSH B01.500.841.075.189.250.250.250 – eimeria
- MeSH B01.500.841.075.189.250.250.250.250 – eimeria tenella
- MeSH B01.500.841.075.189.250.250.400 – isospora
- MeSH B01.500.841.075.189.250.750 – sarcocystidae
- MeSH B01.500.841.075.189.250.750.550 – neospora
- MeSH B01.500.841.075.189.250.750.750 – sarcocystis
- MeSH B01.500.841.075.189.250.750.800 – toxoplasma
- MeSH B01.500.841.075.189.275 – eucoccidiida
- MeSH B01.500.841.075.380 – haemosporida
- MeSH B01.500.841.075.380.611 – plasmodium
- MeSH B01.500.841.075.380.611.461 – plasmodium berghei
- MeSH B01.500.841.075.380.611.490 – plasmodium chabaudi
- MeSH B01.500.841.075.380.611.505 – plasmodium cynomolgi
- MeSH B01.500.841.075.380.611.561 – plasmodium falciparum
- MeSH B01.500.841.075.380.611.576 – plasmodium gallinaceum
- MeSH B01.500.841.075.380.611.610 – plasmodium knowlesi
- MeSH B01.500.841.075.380.611.661 – plasmodium malariae
- MeSH B01.500.841.075.380.611.700 – plasmodium ovale
- MeSH B01.500.841.075.380.611.761 – plasmodium vivax
- MeSH B01.500.841.075.380.611.780 – plasmodium yoelii
- MeSH B01.500.841.075.600 – piroplasmia
- MeSH B01.500.841.075.600.580 – piroplasmida
- MeSH B01.500.841.075.600.580.070 – babesia
- MeSH B01.500.841.075.600.580.070.100 – babesia bovis
- MeSH B01.500.841.075.600.580.070.550 – babesia microti
- MeSH B01.500.841.075.600.580.700 – theileria
- MeSH B01.500.841.075.600.580.700.100 – theileria annulata
- MeSH B01.500.841.075.600.580.700.500 – theileria parva
- MeSH B01.500.841.130 – blood-borne pathogens
- MeSH B01.500.841.185 – ciliophora
- MeSH B01.500.841.185.375 – kinetofragminophorea
- MeSH B01.500.841.185.375.650 – trichostomatida
- MeSH B01.500.841.185.375.650.650 – trichostomatina
- MeSH B01.500.841.185.375.650.650.153 – balantidium
- MeSH B01.500.841.185.650 – oligohymenophorea
- MeSH B01.500.841.185.650.375 – hymenostomatida
- MeSH B01.500.841.185.650.375.550 – peniculina
- MeSH B01.500.841.185.650.375.550.637 – paramecium
- MeSH B01.500.841.185.650.375.550.637.074 – paramecium aurelia
- MeSH B01.500.841.185.650.375.550.637.150 – paramecium caudatum
- MeSH B01.500.841.185.650.375.550.637.700 – paramecium tetraurelia
- MeSH B01.500.841.185.650.375.750 – tetrahymenina
- MeSH B01.500.841.185.650.375.750.850 – tetrahymena
- MeSH B01.500.841.185.650.375.750.850.700 – tetrahymena pyriformis
- MeSH B01.500.841.185.650.375.750.850.875 – tetrahymena thermophila
- MeSH B01.500.841.185.700 – polymenophorea
- MeSH B01.500.841.185.700.400 – hypotrichida
- MeSH B01.500.841.185.700.400.750 – sporadotrichina
- MeSH B01.500.841.185.700.400.750.375 – euplotes
- MeSH B01.500.841.185.700.400.750.600 – oxytricha
- MeSH B01.500.841.342 – haplosporida
- MeSH B01.500.841.525 – myxomycetes
- MeSH B01.500.841.525.600 – physarida
- MeSH B01.500.841.525.600.700 – physarum
- MeSH B01.500.841.525.600.700.550 – physarum polycephalum
- MeSH B01.500.841.637 – phytoplankton
- MeSH B01.500.841.750 – sarcomastigophora
- MeSH B01.500.841.750.443 – mastigophora
- MeSH B01.500.841.750.443.575 – phytomastigophorea
- MeSH B01.500.841.750.443.575.214 – dinoflagellida
- MeSH B01.500.841.750.443.575.214.600 – pfiesteria piscicida
- MeSH B01.500.841.750.443.575.250 – euglenida
- MeSH B01.500.841.750.443.575.250.320 – euglena
- MeSH B01.500.841.750.443.575.250.320.418 – euglena gracilis
- MeSH B01.500.841.750.443.575.900 – volvocida
- MeSH B01.500.841.750.443.575.900.344 – chlamydomonas
- MeSH B01.500.841.750.443.575.900.344.650 – chlamydomonas reinhardtii
- MeSH B01.500.841.750.443.950 – zoomastigophora
- MeSH B01.500.841.750.443.950.250 – diplomonadida
- MeSH B01.500.841.750.443.950.250.385 – giardia
- MeSH B01.500.841.750.443.950.250.385.400 – giardia lamblia
- MeSH B01.500.841.750.443.950.450 – kinetoplastida
- MeSH B01.500.841.750.443.950.450.868 – trypanosomatina
- MeSH B01.500.841.750.443.950.450.868.110 – crithidia
- MeSH B01.500.841.750.443.950.450.868.110.350 – crithidia fasciculata
- MeSH B01.500.841.750.443.950.450.868.488 – leishmania
- MeSH B01.500.841.750.443.950.450.868.488.080 – leishmania braziliensis
- MeSH B01.500.841.750.443.950.450.868.488.230 – leishmania donovani
- MeSH B01.500.841.750.443.950.450.868.488.240 – leishmania enriettii
- MeSH B01.500.841.750.443.950.450.868.488.285 – leishmania guyanensis
- MeSH B01.500.841.750.443.950.450.868.488.325 – leishmania infantum
- MeSH B01.500.841.750.443.950.450.868.488.405 – leishmania major
- MeSH B01.500.841.750.443.950.450.868.488.410 – leishmania mexicana
- MeSH B01.500.841.750.443.950.450.868.488.680 – leishmania tropica
- MeSH B01.500.841.750.443.950.450.868.887 – trypanosoma
- MeSH B01.500.841.750.443.950.450.868.887.080 – trypanosoma brucei brucei
- MeSH B01.500.841.750.443.950.450.868.887.110 – trypanosoma brucei gambiense
- MeSH B01.500.841.750.443.950.450.868.887.115 – trypanosoma brucei rhodesiense
- MeSH B01.500.841.750.443.950.450.868.887.128 – trypanosoma congolense
- MeSH B01.500.841.750.443.950.450.868.887.140 – trypanosoma cruzi
- MeSH B01.500.841.750.443.950.450.868.887.410 – trypanosoma lewisi
- MeSH B01.500.841.750.443.950.450.868.887.850 – trypanosoma vivax
- MeSH B01.500.841.750.443.950.725 – trichomonadida
- MeSH B01.500.841.750.443.950.725.180 – dientamoeba
- MeSH B01.500.841.750.443.950.725.808 – trichomonas
- MeSH B01.500.841.750.443.950.725.808.717 – trichomonas vaginalis
- MeSH B01.500.841.750.443.950.725.849 – tritrichomonas
- MeSH B01.500.841.750.443.950.725.849.325 – tritrichomonas foetus
- MeSH B01.500.841.750.656 – sarcodina
- MeSH B01.500.841.750.656.300 – eumycetozoea
- MeSH B01.500.841.750.656.300.250 – dictyosteliida
- MeSH B01.500.841.750.656.300.250.300 – dictyostelium
- MeSH B01.500.841.750.656.300.600 – physarida
- MeSH B01.500.841.750.656.300.600.700 – physarum
- MeSH B01.500.841.750.656.300.600.700.550 – physarum polycephalum
- MeSH B01.500.841.750.656.475 – lobosea
- MeSH B01.500.841.750.656.475.100 – amoebida
- MeSH B01.500.841.750.656.475.100.075 – acanthopodina
- MeSH B01.500.841.750.656.475.100.075.080 – acanthamoeba
- MeSH B01.500.841.750.656.475.100.075.080.150 – acanthamoeba castellanii
- MeSH B01.500.841.750.656.475.100.200 – blastocystina
- MeSH B01.500.841.750.656.475.100.200.200 – blastocystis
- MeSH B01.500.841.750.656.475.100.200.200.375 – blastocystis hominis
- MeSH B01.500.841.750.656.475.100.700 – tubulina
- MeSH B01.500.841.750.656.475.100.700.089 – Amoeba
- MeSH B01.500.841.750.656.475.100.700.325 – endolimax
- MeSH B01.500.841.750.656.475.100.700.335 – entamoeba
- MeSH B01.500.841.750.656.475.100.700.335.330 – entamoeba histolytica
- MeSH B01.500.841.750.656.475.100.700.430 – hartmannella
- MeSH B01.500.841.750.656.475.700 – schizopyrenida
- MeSH B01.500.841.750.656.475.700.710 – naegleria
- MeSH B01.500.841.750.656.475.700.710.375 – naegleria fowleri
- MeSH B01.500.841.800 – spores
- MeSH B01.500.841.800.800 – spores, protozoan
- MeSH B01.500.841.800.800.600 – oocysts
- MeSH B01.500.841.800.800.800 – sporozoites

The list continues at List of MeSH codes (B02).
