= List of MeSH codes (A15) =

The following is a partial list of the "A" codes for Medical Subject Headings (MeSH), as defined by the United States National Library of Medicine (NLM).

This list continues the information at List of MeSH codes (A14). Codes following these are found at List of MeSH codes (A16). For other MeSH codes, see List of MeSH codes.

The source for this content is the set of 2006 MeSH Trees from the NLM.

== MeSH A15 – hemic and immune systems ==
=== MeSH A15.145 – blood ===
==== MeSH A15.145.229 – blood cells ====
- MeSH A15.145.229.188 – blood platelets
- MeSH A15.145.229.334 – erythrocytes
- MeSH A15.145.229.334.270 – erythrocyte membrane
- MeSH A15.145.229.334.330 – erythrocytes, abnormal
- MeSH A15.145.229.334.330.100 – acanthocytes
- MeSH A15.145.229.334.330.340 – erythrocyte inclusions
- MeSH A15.145.229.334.330.340.335 – heinz bodies
- MeSH A15.145.229.334.330.531 – megaloblasts
- MeSH A15.145.229.334.330.802 – spherocytes
- MeSH A15.145.229.334.760 – reticulocytes
- MeSH A15.145.229.480 – hemocytes
- MeSH A15.145.229.637 – leukocytes
- MeSH A15.145.229.637.415 – granulocytes
- MeSH A15.145.229.637.415.120 – basophils
- MeSH A15.145.229.637.415.345 – eosinophils
- MeSH A15.145.229.637.415.583 – neutrophils
- MeSH A15.145.229.637.555 – leukocytes, mononuclear
- MeSH A15.145.229.637.555.567 – lymphocytes
- MeSH A15.145.229.637.555.567.532 – killer cells
- MeSH A15.145.229.637.555.567.537 – killer cells, natural
- MeSH A15.145.229.637.555.567.537.500 – killer cells, lymphokine-activated
- MeSH A15.145.229.637.555.567.550 – lymphocyte subsets
- MeSH A15.145.229.637.555.567.550.450 – b-lymphocyte subsets
- MeSH A15.145.229.637.555.567.550.500 – t-lymphocyte subsets
- MeSH A15.145.229.637.555.567.562 – b-lymphocytes
- MeSH A15.145.229.637.555.567.562.450 – b-lymphocyte subsets
- MeSH A15.145.229.637.555.567.562.725 – plasma cells
- MeSH A15.145.229.637.555.567.569 – t-lymphocytes
- MeSH A15.145.229.637.555.567.569.200 – cd4-positive t-lymphocytes
- MeSH A15.145.229.637.555.567.569.200.400 – t-lymphocytes, helper-inducer
- MeSH A15.145.229.637.555.567.569.200.400.500 – th1 cells
- MeSH A15.145.229.637.555.567.569.200.400.750 – th2 cells
- MeSH A15.145.229.637.555.567.569.220 – cd8-positive t-lymphocytes
- MeSH A15.145.229.637.555.567.569.220.200 – t-lymphocytes, cytotoxic
- MeSH A15.145.229.637.555.567.569.500 – t-lymphocyte subsets
- MeSH A15.145.229.637.555.567.584 – lymphocytes, null
- MeSH A15.145.229.637.555.567.650 – lymphocytes, tumor-infiltrating
- MeSH A15.145.229.637.555.652 – monocytes
- MeSH A15.145.229.637.555.652.500 – monocytes, activated killer

=== MeSH A15.378 – hematopoietic system ===
==== MeSH A15.378.316 – bone marrow cells ====
- MeSH A15.378.316.340 – granulocytes
- MeSH A15.378.316.340.350 – granulocyte precursor cells
- MeSH A15.378.316.378 – hematopoietic stem cells
- MeSH A15.378.316.378.590 – myeloid progenitor cells
- MeSH A15.378.316.378.590.249 – erythroid progenitor cells
- MeSH A15.378.316.378.590.249.200 – erythroblasts
- MeSH A15.378.316.378.590.249.200.500 – megaloblasts
- MeSH A15.378.316.378.590.249.480 – megakaryocytes
- MeSH A15.378.316.378.590.249.760 – reticulocytes
- MeSH A15.378.316.378.590.350 – granulocyte precursor cells
- MeSH A15.378.316.580 – monocytes

=== MeSH A15.382 – immune system ===
==== MeSH A15.382.032 – antibody-producing cells ====
- MeSH A15.382.032.438 – b-lymphocytes
- MeSH A15.382.032.438.450 – b-lymphocyte subsets
- MeSH A15.382.032.438.725 – plasma cells

==== MeSH A15.382.066 – antigen-presenting cells ====
- MeSH A15.382.066.270 – dendritic cells
- MeSH A15.382.066.270.500 – langerhans cells
- MeSH A15.382.066.275 – dendritic cells, follicular

==== MeSH A15.382.490 – leukocytes ====
- MeSH A15.382.490.315 – granulocytes
- MeSH A15.382.490.315.120 – basophils
- MeSH A15.382.490.315.251 – eosinophils
- MeSH A15.382.490.315.583 – neutrophils
- MeSH A15.382.490.555 – leukocytes, mononuclear
- MeSH A15.382.490.555.567 – lymphocytes
- MeSH A15.382.490.555.567.532 – killer cells
- MeSH A15.382.490.555.567.537 – killer cells, natural
- MeSH A15.382.490.555.567.537.500 – killer cells, lymphokine-activated
- MeSH A15.382.490.555.567.550 – lymphocyte subsets
- MeSH A15.382.490.555.567.550.450 – b-lymphocyte subsets
- MeSH A15.382.490.555.567.550.500 – t-lymphocyte subsets
- MeSH A15.382.490.555.567.562 – b-lymphocytes
- MeSH A15.382.490.555.567.562.450 – b-lymphocyte subsets
- MeSH A15.382.490.555.567.562.725 – plasma cells
- MeSH A15.382.490.555.567.569 – t-lymphocytes
- MeSH A15.382.490.555.567.569.200 – cd4-positive t-lymphocytes
- MeSH A15.382.490.555.567.569.200.400 – t-lymphocytes, helper-inducer
- MeSH A15.382.490.555.567.569.200.400.900 – th1 cells
- MeSH A15.382.490.555.567.569.200.400.905 – th2 cells
- MeSH A15.382.490.555.567.569.200.700 – t-lymphocytes, regulatory
- MeSH A15.382.490.555.567.569.220 – cd8-positive t-lymphocytes
- MeSH A15.382.490.555.567.569.220.200 – t-lymphocytes, cytotoxic
- MeSH A15.382.490.555.567.569.440 – jurkat cells
- MeSH A15.382.490.555.567.569.500 – t-lymphocyte subsets
- MeSH A15.382.490.555.567.622 – lymphocytes, null
- MeSH A15.382.490.555.567.650 – lymphocytes, tumor-infiltrating
- MeSH A15.382.490.555.652 – monocytes
- MeSH A15.382.490.555.652.500 – monocytes, activated killer

==== MeSH A15.382.520 – lymphatic system ====
- MeSH A15.382.520.301 – lymphatic vessels
- MeSH A15.382.520.301.500 – endothelium, lymphatic
- MeSH A15.382.520.301.750 – thoracic duct
- MeSH A15.382.520.604 – lymphoid tissue
- MeSH A15.382.520.604.100 – adenoids
- MeSH A15.382.520.604.114 – bursa of fabricius
- MeSH A15.382.520.604.250 – germinal center
- MeSH A15.382.520.604.250.200 – dendritic cells, follicular
- MeSH A15.382.520.604.412 – lymph nodes
- MeSH A15.382.520.604.412.500 – germinal center
- MeSH A15.382.520.604.412.500.200 – dendritic cells, follicular
- MeSH A15.382.520.604.600 – peyer's patches
- MeSH A15.382.520.604.700 – spleen
- MeSH A15.382.520.604.750 – thymus gland
- MeSH A15.382.520.604.800 – tonsil

==== MeSH A15.382.680 – phagocytes ====
- MeSH A15.382.680.397 – macrophages
- MeSH A15.382.680.397.300 – epithelioid cells
- MeSH A15.382.680.397.368 – foam cells
- MeSH A15.382.680.397.376 – giant cells, foreign-body
- MeSH A15.382.680.397.380 – giant cells, langhans
- MeSH A15.382.680.397.385 – histiocytes
- MeSH A15.382.680.397.588 – kupffer cells
- MeSH A15.382.680.397.600 – macrophages, alveolar
- MeSH A15.382.680.397.630 – macrophages, peritoneal
- MeSH A15.382.680.547 – monocytes
- MeSH A15.382.680.547.500 – monocytes, activated killer
- MeSH A15.382.680.689 – neutrophils

==== MeSH A15.382.812 – reticuloendothelial system ====
- MeSH A15.382.812.522 – macrophages
- MeSH A15.382.812.522.300 – epithelioid cells
- MeSH A15.382.812.522.368 – foam cells
- MeSH A15.382.812.522.376 – giant cells, foreign-body
- MeSH A15.382.812.522.380 – giant cells, langhans
- MeSH A15.382.812.522.385 – histiocytes
- MeSH A15.382.812.522.588 – kupffer cells
- MeSH A15.382.812.522.600 – macrophages, alveolar
- MeSH A15.382.812.522.630 – macrophages, peritoneal
- MeSH A15.382.812.547 – monocytes
- MeSH A15.382.812.547.500 – monocytes, activated killer

The list continues at List of MeSH codes (A16).
