= List of MeSH codes (A14) =

The following is a partial list of the "A" codes for Medical Subject Headings (MeSH), as defined by the United States National Library of Medicine (NLM).

This list continues the information at List of MeSH codes (A13). Codes following these are found at List of MeSH codes (A15). For other MeSH codes, see List of MeSH codes.

The source for this content is the set of 2006 MeSH Trees from the NLM.

== MeSH A14 – stomatognathic system ==
=== MeSH A14.194 – cheek ===
- Annotation: for that external portion of face or that internal portion of mouth; NIM for hamster cheek pouch; buccal mucosa = MOUTH MUCOSA (IM) + CHEEK (NIM); cheek bone fracture = ZYGOMATIC FRACTURES

=== MeSH A14.363 – facial muscles ===
- Scope note: Muscles of facial expression or mimetic muscles that include the numerous muscles supplied by the facial nerve that are attached to and move the skin of the face.

=== MeSH A14.521 – jaw ===
- MeSH A14.521.125 – alveolar process
- MeSH A14.521.125.800 – tooth socket
- MeSH A14.521.320 – dental arch
- MeSH A14.521.632 – mandible
- MeSH A14.521.632.300 – chin
- MeSH A14.521.632.600 – mandibular condyle
- MeSH A14.521.645 – maxilla
- MeSH A14.521.658 – palate
- MeSH A14.521.658.660 – palate, hard

=== MeSH A14.530 – masticatory muscles ===
- MeSH A14.530.630 – masseter muscle
- MeSH A14.530.790 – pterygoid muscles
- MeSH A14.530.940 – temporal muscle

=== MeSH A14.549 – mouth ===
- MeSH A14.549.167 – dentition
- MeSH A14.549.167.229 – dentition, mixed
- MeSH A14.549.167.237 – dentition, permanent
- MeSH A14.549.167.245 – dentition, primary
- MeSH A14.549.167.333 – diastema
- MeSH A14.549.167.646 – periodontium
- MeSH A14.549.167.646.094 – alveolar process
- MeSH A14.549.167.646.094.800 – tooth socket
- MeSH A14.549.167.646.267 – dental cementum
- MeSH A14.549.167.646.374 – epithelial attachment
- MeSH A14.549.167.646.480 – gingiva
- MeSH A14.549.167.646.700 – periapical tissue
- MeSH A14.549.167.646.771 – periodontal ligament
- MeSH A14.549.167.860 – tooth
- MeSH A14.549.167.860.150 – bicuspid
- MeSH A14.549.167.860.200 – cuspid
- MeSH A14.549.167.860.425 – incisor
- MeSH A14.549.167.860.525 – molar
- MeSH A14.549.167.860.525.500 – molar, third
- MeSH A14.549.167.860.700 – tooth, deciduous
- MeSH A14.549.167.860.700.500 – natal teeth
- MeSH A14.549.167.860.715 – tooth, unerupted
- MeSH A14.549.167.900 – tooth components
- MeSH A14.549.167.900.250 – dental cementum
- MeSH A14.549.167.900.255 – dental enamel
- MeSH A14.549.167.900.255.500 – dental pellicle
- MeSH A14.549.167.900.260 – dental pulp
- MeSH A14.549.167.900.265 – dental pulp cavity
- MeSH A14.549.167.900.280 – dentin
- MeSH A14.549.167.900.280.280 – dentin, secondary
- MeSH A14.549.167.900.700 – tooth cervix
- MeSH A14.549.167.900.710 – tooth crown
- MeSH A14.549.167.900.720 – tooth germ
- MeSH A14.549.167.900.720.250 – dental papilla
- MeSH A14.549.167.900.720.255 – dental sac
- MeSH A14.549.167.900.720.265 – enamel organ
- MeSH A14.549.167.900.750 – tooth root
- MeSH A14.549.167.900.750.700 – tooth apex
- MeSH A14.549.336 – lip
- MeSH A14.549.336.505 – labial frenum
- MeSH A14.549.441 – mouth floor
- MeSH A14.549.512 – mouth mucosa
- MeSH A14.549.617 – palate
- MeSH A14.549.617.623 – palatal muscles
- MeSH A14.549.617.660 – palate, hard
- MeSH A14.549.617.780 – palate, soft
- MeSH A14.549.617.780.729 – uvula
- MeSH A14.549.760 – salivary glands
- MeSH A14.549.760.464 – parotid gland
- MeSH A14.549.760.640 – salivary ducts
- MeSH A14.549.760.650 – salivary glands, minor
- MeSH A14.549.760.687 – sublingual gland
- MeSH A14.549.760.812 – submandibular gland
- MeSH A14.549.885 – tongue
- MeSH A14.549.885.431 – lingual frenum
- MeSH A14.549.885.779 – taste buds

=== MeSH A14.724 – pharynx ===
- MeSH A14.724.490 – hypopharynx
- MeSH A14.724.557 – nasopharynx
- MeSH A14.724.603 – oropharynx
- MeSH A14.724.603.925 – tonsil
- MeSH A14.724.617 – pharyngeal muscles
- MeSH A14.724.617.360 – esophageal sphincter, upper

=== MeSH A14.907 – temporomandibular joint ===
- MeSH A14.907.900 – temporomandibular joint disk

The list continues at List of MeSH codes (A15).
