= List of MeSH codes (A12) =

The following is a partial list of the "A" codes for Medical Subject Headings (MeSH), as defined by the United States National Library of Medicine (NLM).

This list continues the information at List of MeSH codes (A11). Codes following these are found at List of MeSH codes (A13). For other MeSH codes, see List of MeSH codes.

The source for this content is the set of 2006 MeSH Trees from the NLM.

== MeSH A12 – fluids and secretions ==
=== MeSH A12.200 – bodily secretions ===
- MeSH A12.200.087 – bile
- MeSH A12.200.147 – cerumen
- MeSH A12.200.194 – colostrum
- MeSH A12.200.307 – gastric juice
- MeSH A12.200.307.603 – gastric acid
- MeSH A12.200.390 – intestinal secretions
- MeSH A12.200.455 – milk
- MeSH A12.200.467 – milk, human
- MeSH A12.200.503 – mucus
- MeSH A12.200.503.339 – cervix mucus
- MeSH A12.200.567 – pancreatic juice
- MeSH A12.200.666 – saliva
- MeSH A12.200.702 – sebum
- MeSH A12.200.732 – semen
- MeSH A12.200.769 – smegma
- MeSH A12.200.808 – sputum
- MeSH A12.200.849 – sweat
- MeSH A12.200.882 – tears
- MeSH A12.200.935 – venoms
- MeSH A12.200.946 – vernix caseosa

=== MeSH A12.207 – body fluids ===
- MeSH A12.207.119 – ascitic fluid
- MeSH A12.207.152 – blood
- MeSH A12.207.152.200 – fetal blood
- MeSH A12.207.152.693 – plasma
- MeSH A12.207.152.846 – serum
- MeSH A12.207.152.846.500 – immune sera
- MeSH A12.207.152.846.500.203 – antilymphocyte serum
- MeSH A12.207.180 – body fluid compartments
- MeSH A12.207.200 – body water
- MeSH A12.207.234 – bronchoalveolar lavage fluid
- MeSH A12.207.270 – extracellular fluid
- MeSH A12.207.270.040 – aqueous humor
- MeSH A12.207.270.210 – cerebrospinal fluid
- MeSH A12.207.270.300 – extravascular lung water (EVLW)
- MeSH A12.207.270.340 – follicular fluid
- MeSH A12.207.270.517 – labyrinthine fluids
- MeSH A12.207.270.517.324 – endolymph
- MeSH A12.207.270.517.678 – perilymph
- MeSH A12.207.270.606 – lymph
- MeSH A12.207.270.606.350 – chyle
- MeSH A12.207.270.695 – plasma
- MeSH A12.207.270.847 – synovial fluid
- MeSH A12.207.515 – intracellular fluid
- MeSH A12.207.739 – nasal lavage fluid
- MeSH A12.207.927 – urine

=== MeSH A12.300 – dental deposits ===
- MeSH A12.300.250 – dental calculus
- MeSH A12.300.300 – dental plaque
- MeSH A12.300.650 – smear layer

=== MeSH A12.383 – exudates and transudates ===
- MeSH A12.383.200 – cyst fluid
- MeSH A12.383.250 – dentinal fluid
- MeSH A12.383.500 – gingival crevicular fluid

=== MeSH A12.459 – feces ===
- MeSH A12.459.529 – meconium
- MeSH A12.459.764 – melena

=== MeSH A12.580 – hyalin ===
The list continues at List of MeSH codes (A13).
