= List of MeSH codes (A16) =

The following is a partial list of the "A" codes for Medical Subject Headings (MeSH), as defined by the United States National Library of Medicine (NLM).

This list continues the information at List of MeSH codes (A15). Codes following these are found at List of MeSH codes (A17). For other MeSH codes, see List of MeSH codes.

The source for this content is the set of 2006 MeSH Trees from the NLM.

== MeSH A16 – embryonic structures ==
=== MeSH A16.254 – embryo ===
- MeSH A16.254.072 – amniotic fluid
- MeSH A16.254.085 – blastocyst
- MeSH A16.254.085.067 – blastoderm
- MeSH A16.254.085.162 – trophoblasts
- MeSH A16.254.090 – blastomeres
- MeSH A16.254.160 – branchial region
- MeSH A16.254.270 – cleavage stage, ovum
- MeSH A16.254.270.274 – blastula
- MeSH A16.254.270.550 – morula
- MeSH A16.254.283 – cloaca
- MeSH A16.254.300 – embryo, nonmammalian
- MeSH A16.254.300.200 – chick embryo
- MeSH A16.254.300.400 – chorioallantoic membrane
- MeSH A16.254.300.600 – cleavage stage, ovum
- MeSH A16.254.300.600.274 – blastula
- MeSH A16.254.300.600.550 – morula
- MeSH A16.254.300.800 – yolk sac
- MeSH A16.254.403 – extraembryonic membranes
- MeSH A16.254.403.147 – allantois
- MeSH A16.254.403.277 – amnion
- MeSH A16.254.403.473 – chorion
- MeSH A16.254.403.473.200 – chorionic villi
- MeSH A16.254.403.981 – yolk sac
- MeSH A16.254.412 – gastrula
- MeSH A16.254.425 – germ layers
- MeSH A16.254.425.273 – ectoderm
- MeSH A16.254.425.407 – endoderm
- MeSH A16.254.425.660 – mesoderm
- MeSH A16.254.425.660.600 – pericytes
- MeSH A16.254.425.660.750 – somites
- MeSH A16.254.462 – limb bud
- MeSH A16.254.500 – mesonephros
- MeSH A16.254.570 – Müllerian ducts
- MeSH A16.254.600 – neural crest
- MeSH A16.254.610 – notochord
- MeSH A16.254.650 – organizers, embryonic
- MeSH A16.254.789 – umbilical cord
- MeSH A16.254.789.641 – umbilical arteries
- MeSH A16.254.789.807 – umbilical veins
- MeSH A16.254.835 – urachus
- MeSH A16.254.891 – vitelline duct
- MeSH A16.254.940 – Wolffian duct

=== MeSH A16.378 – fetus ===
- MeSH A16.378.099 – aborted fetus
- MeSH A16.378.200 – fetal blood
- MeSH A16.378.303 – fetal heart
- MeSH A16.378.303.395 – ductus arteriosus
- MeSH A16.378.303.930 – truncus arteriosus
- MeSH A16.378.529 – meconium
- MeSH A16.378.857 – vernix caseosa

=== MeSH A16.631 – ovum ===
- MeSH A16.631.325 – egg yolk
- MeSH A16.631.886 – vitelline membrane
- MeSH A16.631.900 – zona pellucida

=== MeSH A16.759 – placenta ===
- MeSH A16.759.189 – chorionic villi
- MeSH A16.759.289 – decidua
- MeSH A16.759.289.500 – deciduoma
- MeSH A16.759.802 – trophoblasts

=== MeSH A16.950 – zygote ===
The list continues at List of MeSH codes (A17).
