= List of MeSH codes (A13) =

The following is a partial list of the "A" codes for Medical Subject Headings (MeSH), as defined by the United States National Library of Medicine (NLM).

This list continues the information at List of MeSH codes (A12). Codes following these are found at List of MeSH codes (A14). For other MeSH codes, see List of MeSH codes.

The source for this content is the set of 2006 MeSH Trees from the NLM.

== MeSH A13 – animal structures ==
=== MeSH A13.350 – embryo, nonmammalian ===
- MeSH A13.350.150 – chick embryo
- MeSH A13.350.575 – chorioallantoic membrane

=== MeSH A13.395 – forelimb ===
- MeSH A13.395.248 – carpus, animal
- MeSH A13.395.823 – wing

=== MeSH A13.473 – hindlimb ===
- MeSH A13.473.683 – stifle
- MeSH A13.473.821 – tarsus, animal

=== MeSH A13.507 – horns ===
- MeSH A13.507.288 – antlers

=== MeSH A13.706 – oviducts ===
- MeSH A13.706.500 – fallopian tubes

=== MeSH A13.853 – stomach, avian ===
- MeSH A13.853.363 – gizzard
- MeSH A13.853.710 – proventriculus

=== MeSH A13.869 – stomach, ruminant ===
- MeSH A13.869.106 – abomasum
- MeSH A13.869.524 – omasum
- MeSH A13.869.697 – reticulum
- MeSH A13.869.804 – rumen

=== MeSH A13.970 – wool ===
The list continues at List of MeSH codes (A14).
