= List of MeSH codes (B02) =

The following is a partial list of the "B" codes for Medical Subject Headings (MeSH), as defined by the United States National Library of Medicine (NLM).

This list continues the information at List of MeSH codes (B01). Codes following these are found at List of MeSH codes (B03). For other MeSH codes, see List of MeSH codes.

The source for this content is the set of 2006 MeSH Trees from the NLM.

== MeSH B02 – algae ==
=== MeSH B02.050 – algae, brown ===
- MeSH B02.050.040 – ascophyllum
- MeSH B02.050.212 – fucus
- MeSH B02.050.425 – kelp
- MeSH B02.050.450 – laminaria
- MeSH B02.050.480 – macrocystis
- MeSH B02.050.725 – sargassum
- MeSH B02.050.800 – undaria

=== MeSH B02.075 – algae, golden-brown ===
- MeSH B02.075.600 – ochromonas

=== MeSH B02.080 – algae, green ===
- MeSH B02.080.133 – acetabularia
- MeSH B02.080.300 – caulerpa
- MeSH B02.080.344 – chlamydomonas
- MeSH B02.080.344.650 – chlamydomonas reinhardtii
- MeSH B02.080.469 – chlorella
- MeSH B02.080.469.400 – chlorella vulgaris
- MeSH B02.080.634 – prototheca
- MeSH B02.080.800 – scenedesmus
- MeSH B02.080.900 – ulva
- MeSH B02.080.950 – volvox

=== MeSH B02.100 – algae, red ===
- MeSH B02.100.150 – chondrus
- MeSH B02.100.325 – gracilaria
- MeSH B02.100.500 – laurencia
- MeSH B02.100.585 – plocamium
- MeSH B02.100.600 – porphyra
- MeSH B02.100.610 – porphyridium

=== MeSH B02.150 – characeae ===
- MeSH B02.150.150 – chara
- MeSH B02.150.575 – nitella

=== MeSH B02.200 – euglenida ===
- MeSH B02.200.210 – euglena
- MeSH B02.200.210.418 – euglena gracilis
- MeSH B02.200.210.500 – euglena longa

=== MeSH B02.500 – lichens ===
- MeSH B02.500.915 – usnea

=== MeSH B02.650 – oomycetes ===
- MeSH B02.650.050 – achlya
- MeSH B02.650.075 – aphanomyces
- MeSH B02.650.500 – lagenidium
- MeSH B02.650.710 – peronospora
- MeSH B02.650.725 – phytophthora
- MeSH B02.650.750 – pythium
- MeSH B02.650.825 – saprolegnia

=== MeSH B02.750 – seaweed ===
- MeSH B02.750.500 – kelp

The list continues at List of MeSH codes (B03).
