= Andreas Weigend =

American computer scientist

Andreas S. Weigend
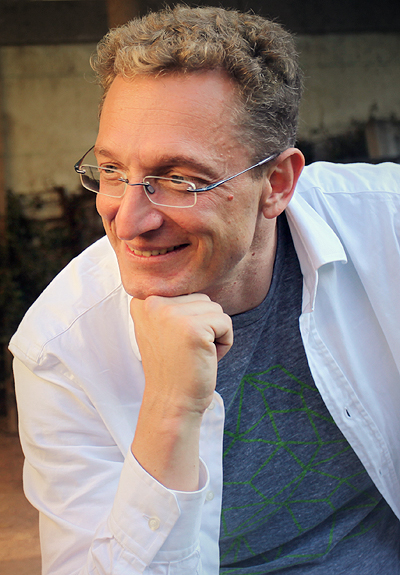
- Born: 1961 (age 64–65); Freiburg i. Br.
- Citizenship: United States
- Education: University of Bonn; Stanford University
- Spouse: Zuoren Pan (m. 2022)
- Scientific career
- Fields: Computer Science
- Workplaces: Stanford University, University of California at Berkeley, Tsinghua University, Cheung Kong Graduate School of Business, Fudan
- Doctoral advisor: David Rumelhart

Andreas Sebastian Weigend (born 1961) is a German-American computer scientist and author of the book Data for the People (Basic Books, 2017). He was a member of Germany's Digital Council under Merkel, Digitalrat.

Weigend studied physics and philosophy at the University of Bonn and received a PhD in physics from Stanford University in 1991. He was the Chief Scientist at Amazon.com.

== Early life and education ==
Weigend studied electrical engineering before pursuing studies in physics and philosophy at Karlsruhe, Cambridge and Bonn. In 1983, he was a summer student at CERN. He later received a doctorate in physics from Stanford University.

== Academic and industry career ==
Weigend worked at Amazon from 2002 to 2004 as its chief scientist. During his time there, he was involved in the company's data strategy and research into customer behaviour.

== Public service in Germany ==
In August 2018, Weigend was appointed to the German government's Digital Council, an advisory body established under Chancellor Angela Merkel. He left the council in March 2019.

== Publications ==
- Weigend, Andreas S.; Huberman, Bernardo A.; Rumelhart, David E.; PREDICTING THE FUTURE: A CONNECTIONIST APPROACH, 1990, International Journal of Neural Systems, 193-209, V 01, N 03 , https://doi.org/10.1142/S0129065790000102
- Weigend, Andreas S.; Rumelhart, David E.; Huberman, Bernardo A. (1991). “Generalization by Weight-Elimination with Application to Forecasting”. Advances in Neural Information Processing Systems 3. Morgan Kaufmann. pp. 875–882
- Weigend, Andreas S.; Gershenfeld, Neil A., eds. (1994). Time Series Prediction: Forecasting the Future and Understanding the Past. Addison-Wesley. ISBN 978-0-201-62602-5.
- Dirst, Matthew; Weigend, Andreas S. (1994). “Baroque Forecasting: On Completing J. S. Bach’s Last Fugue”. In Time Series Prediction, 151–172.
- Weigend, Andreas S. (1994). “Connectionism for Music and Audition”. Advances in Neural Information Processing Systems. 6.
- Nix, David A.; Weigend, Andreas S. (1995). “Learning Local Error Bars for Nonlinear Regression”. In Tesauro, G.; Touretzky, D.; Leen, T. (eds.). Advances in Neural Information Processing Systems 7. MIT Press. pp. 489–496.
- Weigend, Andreas S.; Abu-Mostafa, Yaser; Refenes, A.-Paul N., eds. (1997). Decision Technologies for Financial Engineering. World Scientific. ISBN 978-981-02-3123-1.
- Abu-Mostafa, Yaser S.; LeBaron, Blake; Lo, Andrew W.; Weigend, Andreas S., eds. (2000). Computational Finance 1999. MIT Press. ISBN 978-0-262-01178-5.
- Weigend, Andreas (2017). Data for the People: How to Make Our Post-Privacy Economy Work for You. Basic Books. ISBN 978-0-465-04469-6
