= Brattleboro rat =

Strain of laboratory rat

The Brattleboro rat is a strain of laboratory rat descended from a litter born in West Brattleboro, Vermont in 1961 without the ability to produce the hormone vasopressin, which helps control kidney function. The rats' lack of vasopressin was the result of a naturally occurring genetic mutation.

The rats were being raised for laboratory use by Dr. Henry A. Schroeder and technician Tim Vinton, who noticed that the litter of 17 drank and urinated excessively. The researchers determined that the rats failed to produce vasopressin, an antidiuretic hormone, and they gave the rats to Dartmouth Medical School (DMS). Researchers there determined that the rats had a mutation in the gene that regulates the production of vasopressin.

The DMS researchers bred the rats for distribution to scientists around the world to use in testing the possible role of vasopressin in any given biological function. The Brattleboro rat was an early and naturally occurring precursor of the knockout rat. They have also been widely used in neuroscience and behavioral research to explore vasopressin’s role in stress responses, social bonding, and memory.

== See also ==
- Laboratory rat
- Diabetes insipidus
