= Zhang Xu (neuroscientist) =

Chinese neuroscientist (born 1961)

- 张旭
- Born: August 1961 (age 65); Nanjing, Jiangsu, China
- Education: Fourth Military Medical University; Karolinska Institute
- Scientific career
- Fields: Molecular neuroscience
- Workplaces: Chinese Academy of Sciences Institute of Neuroscience

Zhang Xu (Chinese: 张旭; born August 1961) is a Chinese neuroscientist. He is an academician of the Chinese Academy of Sciences (CAS) and The World Academy of Sciences. He is a research professor at the CAS Institute of Neuroscience (ION) and serves as Vice President of the Shanghai Branch of the CAS.

== Biography ==
Zhang was born in Nanjing, Jiangsu, China in 1961. From 1980 to 1985, he studied at the Fourth Military Medical University in Xi'an. After earning a bachelor's degree in medicine, he worked at the university as a teaching assistant from 1985 to 1990. In 1990, he went to Sweden to pursue graduate studies at Karolinska Institute, where he earned his MD and PhD in 1994 from the department of neuroscience.

In August 1994, Zhang returned to China and joined the faculty of the Institute of Neuroscience of the Fourth Military Medical University. He was later promoted to professor and deputy director of the institute.

In December 1999, Zhang joined the Institute of Neuroscience under the Shanghai Institutes for Biological Sciences of the Chinese Academy of Sciences (CAS) as a Principal Investigator, and became a Senior Principal Investigator in 2005. He was appointed Vice President of the Shanghai Institutes for Biological Sciences in 2008 and Vice President of the Shanghai Branch of the CAS in 2010.

Zhang was elected an academician of the CAS in 2015 and a fellow of The World Academy of Sciences in 2018. His contributions include discovering "the changes in gene expression of somatosensory ganglia associated with chronic pain", "mechanisms for regulating the functions of opioid receptors and Na+/K+ pump in sensory neurons" and "that FGF13 regulated brain development and involved X-linked intellectual disability". He received the Ho Leung Ho Lee Prize for Science and Technology Progress (2005) and the Lilly-Asian Scientific Excellence Award.
