= Vanillylmandelic acid =

Names
- Preferred IUPAC name Hydroxy(4-hydroxy-3-methoxyphenyl)acetic acid
- Other names 2-Hydroxy-2-(4-hydroxy-3-methoxyphenyl)acetic acid α,4-Dihydroxy-3-methoxybenzeneacetic acid VMA; Vanillomandelic acid Vanillylmandelic acid Vanilmandelic acid

Identifiers
CAS Number	55-10-7
3D model (JSmol)	Interactive image; Interactive image
Beilstein Reference	2213227
ChEBI	CHEBI:20106
ChemSpider	1207
ECHA InfoCard	100.000.204
EC Number	201-701-6
IUPHAR/BPS	6645
MeSH	Vanilmandelic+acid
PubChem CID	1245
UNII	0DQI268449
CompTox Dashboard (EPA)	DTXSID10861583
- InChI: InChI=1S/C9H10O5/c1-14-7-4-5(2-3-6(7)10)8(11)9(12)13/h2-4,8,10-11H,1H3,(H,12,13) Key: CGQCWMIAEPEHNQ-UHFFFAOYSA-N; InChI=1S/C9H10O5/c1-14-7-4-5(2-3-6(7)10)8(11)9(12)13/h2-4,8,10-11H,1H3,(H,12,13)
- SMILES: COC1=C(C=CC(=C1)C(C(=O)O)O)O; O=C(O)C(O)c1cc(OC)c(O)cc1

Properties
Chemical formula	C_{9}H_{10}O_{5}
Molar mass	198.173 g/mol
Appearance	White powder
Melting point	133 °C (271 °F; 406 K)

Hazards
Safety data sheet (SDS)	MSDS at Sigma Aldrich
- Except where otherwise noted, data are given for materials in their standard state (at 25 °C [77 °F], 100 kPa). verify (what is ?) Infobox references

Vanillylmandelic acid (VMA) is a chemical intermediate in the synthesis of artificial vanilla flavorings and is an end-stage metabolite of the catecholamines (epinephrine, and norepinephrine). It is produced via intermediary metabolites.

== Chemical synthesis ==
VMA synthesis is the first step of a two-step process practiced by Rhodia since the 1970s to synthesize artificial vanilla. Specifically the reaction entails the condensation of guaiacol and glyoxylic acid in an ice cold, aqueous solution with sodium hydroxide.

== Biological elimination ==
Norepinephrine degradation. Vanillylmandelic acid is shown at top right. Enzymes are shown in boxes.

VMA is found in the urine, along with other catecholamine metabolites, including homovanillic acid (HVA), metanephrine, and normetanephrine. In timed urine tests the quantity excreted (usually per 24 hours) is assessed along with creatinine clearance, and the quantity of cortisols, catecholamines, and metanephrines excreted is also measured.

== Clinical significance ==
Urinary VMA is elevated in patients with tumors that secrete catecholamines.

These urinalysis tests are used to diagnose an adrenal gland tumor called pheochromocytoma, a tumor of catecholamine-secreting chromaffin cells. These tests may also be used to diagnose neuroblastomas, and to monitor treatment of these conditions.

Norepinephrine is metabolised into normetanephrine and VMA. Norepinephrine is one of the hormones produced by the adrenal glands, which are found on top of the kidneys. These hormones are released into the blood during times of physical or emotional stress, which are factors that may skew the results of the test.
