= Max Schottelius =

German pathologist

Max Schottelius

Max Schottelius (1849–1919) was a German pathologist and microbiologist who was part of the team that first medically described pheochromocytoma in 1886. Schottelius provided the first histological description of the catecholamine secreting tumor found in the adrenal glands when he and pathologist Rudoff Maier performed an autopsy of a woman who had recently died from severe hypertension and a heart attack likely due to an overabundance of catecholamines from the tumor. Maier had performed the autopsy of the woman and found two tumors (one in each adrenal gland). Schotellius described the histological appearance of both tumors and noted that they turned brown in color when exposed to chromate containing Mueller's solution. This characteristic brownish appearance, known as the chromaffin reaction, was due to the oxidation of catecholamines in the tumor. The chromaffin reaction was used to diagnose pheochromocytomas for much of the 20th century until being supplanted by immunohistochemical staining starting in the 1980s. The clinical history, symptoms and further characteristics of pheochromocytoma were described by the third member of the team, Felix Fraenkel.

Schottelius was a professor of pathology at the University of Marburg where he also taught hygiene (a historical term for microbiology and study of how microorganisms lead to communicable diseases). He was a professor of the institute of pathology at the University of Freiburg in 1883 when in 1889 he founded the institute of hygiene, one of the first such institutes in Germany. After the first histological examination of pheochromocytoma and the chromaffin reaction, his latter career was mostly in the study of hygiene. His 1909 book Bacteria was intended to be read by the general public. The book was reviewed in April 1913 by the New England Journal of Medicine who stated: "It is very admirable in its arrangement and treatment of subjects and valuable because of its sane presentation...". The journal favorably reviewed Schottelius' second edition for addition of chapters pertaining to protozoa and vaccination for protection against infectious diseases. The journal also stated the book was a salient addition to the field given the misinformation on the topic in the popular press.

In 1904 he nominated Robert Koch for a Nobel Prize in Medicine, which was later awarded to Koch in 1905.

Schottelius' hobbies included driving his car and sailing. He was one of the first owners of a private car in Freiburg. He disappeared when sailing on Lake Constance on October 12, 1919, and was presumed lost at sea, his body was never found.

Schottelius is a descendant of German grammarian Justus Georg Schottelius.
