= Zhengping Zhuang =

American physician-scientist and cancer researcher

- Education: Shanghai Jiao Tong University School of Medicine (M.D.); Wayne State University (Ph.D.)
- Known for: Cancer genetics, laser-capture microdissection, Pacak–Zhuang syndrome
- Awards: Stowell–Orbison Award (1994); Gordon F. Vawter Award (1996); Federal Technology Transfer Awards (2018–2022); NIH APAO Outstanding Achievement Award (1999); Cy Katzen Humanitarian Award (2014)
- Scientific career
- Fields: Molecular pathology, cancer genetics, translational oncology
- Workplaces: National Cancer Institute, National Institutes of Health

Zhengping Zhuang is an American physician-scientist and cancer researcher. He is known for contributions to molecular pathology, cancer genetics, and translational oncology. He is Senior Investigator at the Neuro-Oncology Branch of the National Cancer Institute (NCI), part of the National Institutes of Health (NIH). His work has advanced fundamental understanding of cancer biology and has contributed to multiple therapeutic innovations.

== Education and training ==
Zhuang received his M.D. from Shanghai Jiao Tong University School of Medicine in 1983 and completed a residency in general surgery at Rui Jin Hospital. He earned a Ph.D. in pharmacology from Wayne State University in 1990, followed by a postdoctoral fellowship at Harvard Medical School. He later completed residency training in transitional medicine at Henry Ford Hospital and in anatomic pathology at the NIH Laboratory of Pathology.

== Career ==
Zhuang joined the NIH in the early 1990s as a resident and subsequently served as staff pathologist at the NCI. From 1999 to 2016, he was Head of the Molecular Pathogenesis Unit at the National Institute of Neurological Disorders and Stroke (NINDS). Since 2017, he has been Senior Investigator in the Neuro-Oncology Branch at the NCI. He also holds an adjunct professorship at the Uniformed Services University of the Health Sciences.

== Research ==
Zhuang's research spans cancer genomics, hereditary tumor syndromes, immunotherapy, and therapeutic development. His work frequently bridges basic and translational science, with emphasis on central nervous system (CNS) tumors.

Zhuang contributed to the discovery and characterization of several cancer-associated genes, including HIF2A (EPAS1), which causes a tumor-predisposition syndrome now known as Pacak–Zhuang syndrome;

== Selected publications ==
- Emmert-Buck, MR; Bonner RF; Smith PD; Zhuang Z (1996). "Laser capture microdissection". Science. 274 (5289): 998–1001. Bibcode:1996Sci...274..998E. doi:10.1126/science.274.5289.998. PMID 8875945.
- Schmidt, L; Duh F-M; Chen F; Zhuang Z (1997). "Germline mutations in the MET proto-oncogene in hereditary papillary renal carcinoma". Nature Genetics. 16 (1): 68–73. doi:10.1038/ng0597-68. PMID 9140397.
- Zhuang, Z; Yang C; Cao L (2012). "Somatic mutations in EPAS1 in patients with paraganglioma and polycythemia". New England Journal of Medicine. 367 (10): 922–930. doi:10.1056/NEJMoa1205119. PMC 3432945. PMID 22931260.
- Li, C; Xie W; Zhuang Z (2020). "Somatic SF3B1 hotspot mutation in prolactinomas". Nature Communications. 11 (1) 2506. Bibcode:2020NatCo..11.2506L. doi:10.1038/s41467-020-16052-8. PMC 7253411. PMID 32461610.
- Wang, H; Zhuang Z; Pacak K (2022). "Somatic mosaicism of EPAS1 mutations in Pacak-Zhuang syndrome". Endocrine Practice. 28 (6): 576–584. doi:10.1016/j.eprac.2022.04.012. PMC 9271630. PMID 35489703.
- Ho, WS; Wang H; Zhuang Z (2018). "Pharmacologic inhibition of protein phosphatase-2A achieves durable immune-mediated antitumor activity when combined with PD-1 blockade". Nature Communications. 9 (1): 381–383. Bibcode:2018NatCo...9.2126H. doi:10.1038/s41467-018-04425-z. PMC 5974350. PMID 29844594.
- Wang, H; Pacak K; Zhuang Z (2024). "rWTC-MBTA Vaccine Induces Potent Adaptive Immune Responses Against Glioblastomas via Dynamic Activation of Dendritic Cells". Advanced Science. 11 (14) e2308280. Bibcode:2024AdvSc..1108280W. doi:10.1002/advs.202308280. PMC 11005728. PMID 38298111.
