= Belzutifan =

Chemical compound

Clinical data
- Pronunciation: /bɛlˈzuːtɪfæn/ bel-ZOO-ti-fan
- Trade names: Welireg
- Other names: MK-6482, PT2977
- AHFS/Drugs.com: Monograph
- MedlinePlus: a621047
- License data: US DailyMed: Belzutifan
- Pregnancy category: AU: D
- Routes of administration: By mouth
- Drug class: Antineoplastic
- ATC code: L01XX74 (WHO)

Legal status
- Legal status: AU: S4 (Prescription only); CA: ℞-only; UK: POM (Prescription only); US: ℞-only; EU: Rx-only

Identifiers
- IUPAC name: 3-{[(1S,2S,3R)-2,3-Difluoro-1-hydroxy-7-(methylsulfonyl)-2,3-dihydro-1H-inden-4-yl]oxy}-5-fluorobenzonitrile
- CAS Number: 1672668-24-4
- PubChem CID: 117947097
- DrugBank: DB15463
- ChemSpider: 59053536
- UNII: 7K28NB895L
- KEGG: D11954
- ChEMBL: ChEMBL4585668
- PDB ligand: 72Q (PDBe, RCSB PDB)
- CompTox Dashboard (EPA): DTXSID201334517

Chemical and physical data
- Formula: C_{17}H_{12}F_{3}NO_{4}S
- Molar mass: 383.34 g·mol^{−1}
- 3D model (JSmol): Interactive image
- SMILES: CS(=O)(=O)c1ccc(Oc2cc(F)cc(C#N)c2)c2c1[C@H](O)[C@H](F)[C@@H]2F
- InChI: InChI=1S/C17H12F3NO4S/c1-26(23,24)12-3-2-11(13-14(12)17(22)16(20)15(13)19)25-10-5-8(7-21)4-9(18)6-10/h2-6,15-17,22H,1H3/t15-,16-,17+/m1/s1; Key:LOMMPXLFBTZENJ-ZACQAIPSSA-N

Belzutifan, sold under the brand name Welireg, is an anti-cancer medication used for the treatment of von Hippel–Lindau disease-associated renal cell carcinoma. It is taken by mouth. Belzutifan is an hypoxia-inducible factor-2 alpha (HIF-2α) inhibitor.

Belzutifan's capacity to reduce serum erythropoietin verified its clinical applicability for the treatment of malignancies linked to von Hippel-Lindau (VHL), such as renal cell carcinoma (RCC) with clear cell histology (ccRCC), pancreatic lesions, neuroendocrine tumors, and CNS hemangioblastomas or pancreatic neuroendocrine tumors (pNET), which do not require immediate surgery. Belzutifan obtained a disease control rate of 80% in pretreated ccRCC during a phase I trial.

The most common side effects include decreased hemoglobin, anemia, hypoxia, fatigue, increased creatinine, headache, dizziness, increased glucose, and nausea.

Belzutifan was approved for medical use in the United States in August 2021, in the United Kingdom in May 2022, and in the European Union in February 2025. Belzutifan is the first hypoxia-inducible factor-2 alpha inhibitor therapy approved in the US. The US Food and Drug Administration (FDA) considers it to be a first-in-class medication. Belzutifan is the first medication to be awarded an "innovation passport" from the UK Medicines and Healthcare products Regulatory Agency.

== Medical uses ==
Belzutifan is indicated for treatment of adults with von Hippel-Lindau (VHL) disease who require therapy for associated renal cell carcinoma (RCC), central nervous system (CNS) hemangioblastomas, or pancreatic neuroendocrine tumors (pNET), not requiring immediate surgery. Belzutifan was also found to be efficacious in an adolescent who had Pacak–Zhuang syndrome with polycythemia and paragangliomas. In addition to its clinical benefits in stabilizing and reducing the size of pheochromocytomas and paragangliomas in Pacak-Zhuang syndrome, and its effectiveness in lowering hemoglobin and hematocrit levels to reduce the need for frequent phlebotomies, belzutifan also has a rapid therapeutic effect in acutely lowering catecholamines, thereby controlling life-threatening hypertensive crises and tachyarrhythmias associated with catecholamine excess.

In May 2025, the US Food and Drug Administration approved belzutifan for people aged twelves years of age and older with locally advanced, unresectable or metastatic pheochromocytoma or paraganglioma, marking the first oral treatment authorized for these tumors.

In September 2026, the indication for belzutifan was expanded in combination with lenvatinib for the treatment of adults with advanced renal cell carcinoma with a clear cell component (ccRCC) following a programmed death receptor-1 or programmed death-ligand 1 inhibitor.

== Adverse effects ==
The US prescribing information for belzutifan includes a boxed warning for embryo-fetal toxicity, as well as warnings and precautions for anemia and hypoxia. For the belzutifan and lenvatinib combination, warnings and precautions also include cardiac dysfunction.

The most common side effects include decreased hemoglobin, anemia, hypoxia, fatigue, increased creatinine, headache, dizziness, increased glucose, and nausea.

Anemia, tiredness, headaches, vertigo, nausea, and dyspnea are the most typical side effects. All participants in the phase II trial reported a hemoglobin reduction of at least 1.9 g/dL; however, only a small number of individuals needed transfusions or erythropoietin-stimulating medications. Because of the downstream effect of HIF-2 inhibition, anemia was a predicted negative outcome of inhibiting the EPO gene. The majority of negative outcomes were grade 1 or 2, while 33% of patients experienced grade 3 to 5 occurrences. In 43% of patients, the course of treatment was discontinued, and in 15% of patients, the dosage had to be adjusted. 2% of patients stopped receiving therapy as a result of a treatment-related adverse events. Fatigue, increased creatinine, headache, dizziness, elevated hyperglycemia, and nausea were the most frequent side effects, including laboratory abnormalities, recorded in 20% or less of patients. Belzutifan has the potential to harm fetuses and embryos during pregnancy and can render some hormonal contraceptives ineffective Belzutifan had a good safety profile and was well tolerated throughout the three-year follow-up following the phase I trial. There were no new substantial safety concerns or grade 4 or 5 adverse events. Hypoxia is a notable adverse effect observed in approximately 14% of patients treated with Belzutifan. Most affected patients exhibit normal pulmonary function tests and imaging; however, those with pulmonary metastases or anemia may be at increased risk. The exact mechanism of Belzutifan-induced hypoxia remains unclear, but evidence suggests that affected patients often reside at higher altitudes and may develop right-to-left intrapulmonary shunting. Given the role of HIF2-α in surfactant synthesis in animal models, one hypothesis is that reduced surfactant levels may impair oxygenation and promote shunting through dead space.

=== Fatalities linked to initiation ===
There have been some reports of fatalities of VHL patients during initiation of belzutifan.

== History ==
The FDA granted the application for belzutifan orphan drug designation.

Merck announced in May 2019, that it had acquired Peloton Therapeutics for the development of novel small-molecule therapeutic candidates targeting HIF-2, with belzutifan as the lead candidate. The purchase was completed in July 2019. Merck has patent protection for belzutifan in the United States that is valid until 2034, as of May 2021.

== Society and culture ==
=== Legal status ===
In December 2024, the Committee for Medicinal Products for Human Use of the European Medicines Agency adopted a positive opinion, recommending the granting of a conditional marketing authorization for the medicinal product Welireg, intended for the treatment of advanced clear cell renal cell carcinoma and von Hippel-Lindau disease-associated tumors. The applicant for this medicinal product is Merck Sharp & Dohme B.V. Belzutifan was authorized for medical use in the European Union in February 2025.
