= Incidental medical findings =

Medical conditions discovered unintentionally

Incidental medical findings are previously undiagnosed medical or psychiatric conditions that are discovered unintentionally and during evaluation for a medical or psychiatric condition. Such findings may occur in a variety of settings, including routine medical care, during biomedical research, during post-mortem autopsy, or during genetic testing.

A report by the Presidential Commission for the Study of Bioethical Issues on incidental findings

== Medical imaging ==
An incidentaloma is a tumor found by coincidence which is often benign and does not cause any clinically significant symptoms; however a small percentage do turn out to be malignant. Incidentalomas are common, with up to 7% of all patients over 60 harboring a benign growth, often of the adrenal gland, which is detected when diagnostic imaging is used for the analysis of unrelated symptoms.

As 37% of patients receiving whole-body CT scan may have abnormal findings that need further evaluation and with the increase of "whole-body CT scanning" as part of health screening programs, the chance of finding incidentalomas is expected to increase.

=== Neuroimaging ===
Incidental findings in neuroimaging are common, with the prevalence of neoplastic incidental brain findings increasing with age. Even in healthy subjects acting as controls in research incidental findings are not rare. As most neuroimaging studies are performed in adults, less is known about the prevalence of incidental findings in children. A study in 2017 in nearly 4000 children between 8 and 12 reported that approximately 1 in 200 children showed asymptomatic incidental findings that required clinical follow-up.

Pituitary adenomas are tumors that occur in the pituitary gland, and account for about 15% of intracranial neoplasms. They often remain undiagnosed, and are often an incidental finding during autopsy. Microadenomas (<10mm) have an estimated prevalence of 16.7% (14.4% in autopsy studies and 22.5% in radiologic studies).

== Genetic testing ==
Unintentional genetic findings (aka "incidentalomes") are more commonly encountered with the advent of biomedical technologies capable of quickly and reliably performing genomic analysis, such as whole-genome sequencing. As with medical imaging, the capacity to measure biologic information in the form of genetic variation may exceed the scientific understanding of what the findings mean.

In 2013, the American College of Medical Genetics and Genomic Working Group on Incidental Findings published preliminary guidelines for clinical laboratories that perform clinical exome and genome sequencing. They outlined a list of "medically actionable" pathogenic gene mutations, mostly monogenetic or single-gene disorders, which were significantly associated with important medical diagnoses and which should be reported to the patient "regardless of the proband's phenotype or age".
