= Pheochromocytoma =

Tumor of the adrenal medulla which secretes adrenal hormones

- Other names: Phaeochromocytoma, adrenal medullary tumor, chromaffin cell tumors, paraganglioma
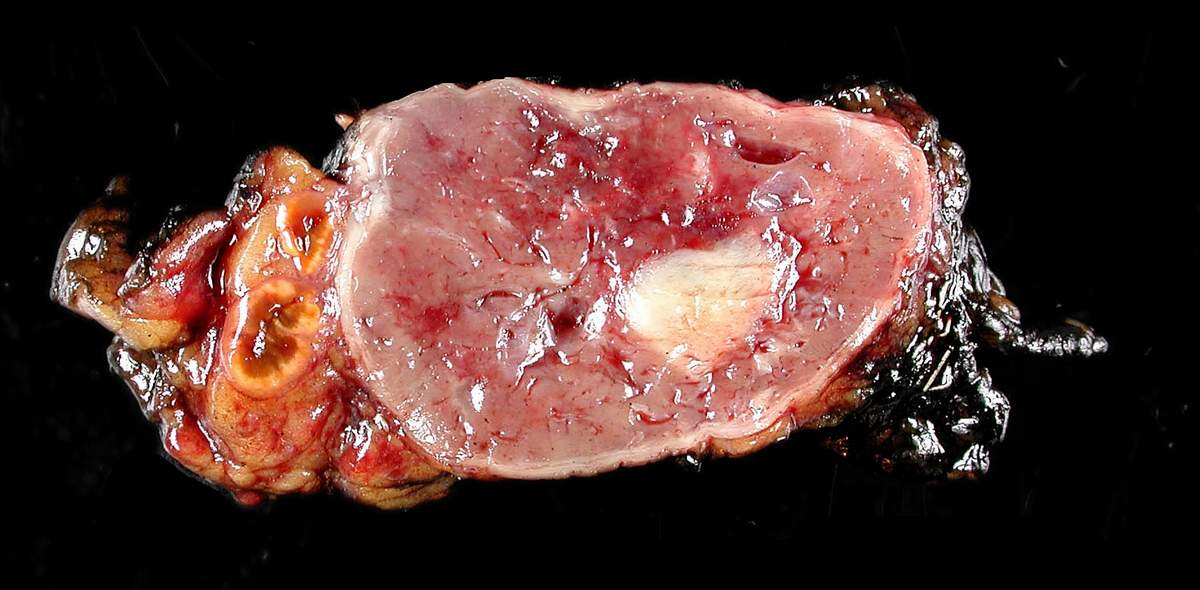
- Normal remnant adrenal gland (left) with a pheochromocytoma (right) involving the adrenal medulla
- Pronunciation: /ˌfiːoʊˌkroʊmoʊsʌɪˈtoʊmə/ (fee-oh-kroh-moh-sahy-toh-muh)
- Specialty: Endocrinology, oncology
- Symptoms: Hypertension, tachycardia, anxiety, sweating, headache, pallor
- Complications: Hypertensive crisis
- Causes: 80% genetic
- Diagnostic method: Elevated plasma free metanephrines, plasma catecholamines, urinary catecholamines, MRI, PET Scan
- Treatment: Surgery, chemotherapy, radiation, medication
- Medication: Alpha blockers (doxazosin, prazosin, terazosin), beta blockers
- Frequency: 0.8 per 100,000 persons

Pheochromocytoma (British English: phaeochromocytoma) is a rare tumor of the adrenal medulla composed of chromaffin cells and is a pharmacologically volatile, potentially lethal catecholamine-containing tumor of chromaffin tissue. It is part of the paraganglioma (PGL). These neuroendocrine tumors can be sympathetic, where they release catecholamines into the bloodstream which cause the most common symptoms, including hypertension (high blood pressure), tachycardia (fast heart rate), sweating, and headaches. Some PGLs may secrete little to no catecholamines, or only secrete paroxysmally (episodically), and other than secretions, PGLs can still become clinically relevant through other secretions or mass effect (most common with head and neck PGL). PGLs of the head and neck are typically parasympathetic and their sympathetic counterparts are predominantly located in the abdomen and pelvis, particularly concentrated at the organ of Zuckerkandl at the bifurcation of the aorta.

== Signs and symptoms ==
The symptoms of a sympathetic pheochromocytoma are related to sympathetic nervous system hyperactivity. The classic triad includes headaches (likely related to elevated blood pressure, or hypertension), tachycardia/elevated heart rate, and hyperhidrosis (excessive sweating, particularly at night). However, patients are unlikely to experience continuous symptoms. Due to the paroxysmal nature of catecholamine synthesis and release, patients may experience "attacks" or "spells" where they are suddenly overwhelmed with signs and symptoms of their tumor. Attacks can occur spontaneously (without warning) or may be triggered by a variety of pharmaceutical agents (including histamine, metoclopramide, glucagon, and adrenocorticotropic hormone), foods that contain tyramine (cheese and wine), intraoperative tumor manipulation, intubation, or during anesthetic induction.

Adrenal gland; the medulla (center, red) is the origin of the pheochromocytoma.

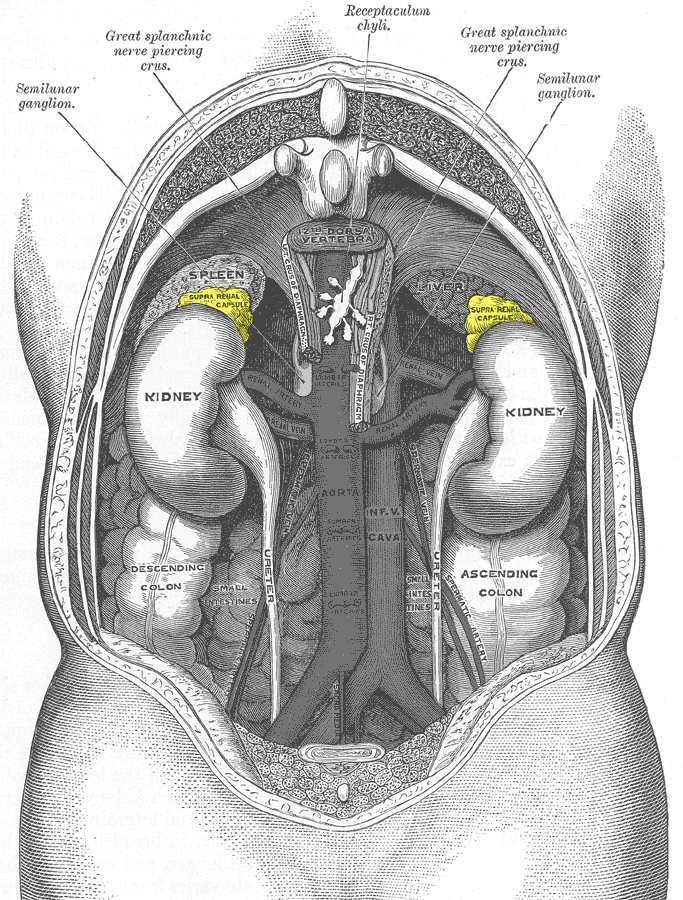
There is an adrenal gland, highlighted in yellow, on top of each of the kidneys.

Other clinical manifestations that have been reported include (in no particular order):

- Pallor
- Heat intolerance
- Weight loss
- Chest or abdominal discomfort
- Palpitations
- Nausea/vomiting
- Constipation
- Orthostatic hypotension — becoming lightheaded or dizzy after swiftly changing positions
- Psychiatric manifestations
  - Anxiety, panic attacks, nervousness, tremors
- Hyperglycemia (high blood sugar)

=== Complications ===
While the symptoms of a pheochromocytoma are quite common, the disease has been referred to as "the great mimic". It is estimated that approximately 0.1% of patients with hypertension have a pheochromocytoma, and it is often misdiagnosed as essential hypertension. As symptoms are often paroxysmal (episodic/sporadic), patients may not immediately seek treatment as the problem "disappears on its own". Furthermore, when pictured in the ideal clinical scenario (an older woman in her mid-50s), the spontaneous attacks of flushing, sweating, and a racing heart may be mistaken for pre-menopausal related hot flashes. Unmanaged pheochromocytoma is dangerous and can lead to serious, potentially fatal complications, including stroke and hypertension-induced organ damage. The cardiovascular system is the most commonly involved.

In pregnancy, pheochromocytoma is associated with significant maternal and fetal mortality, mainly due to hypertensive crisis in the mother and intrauterine growth restriction in the fetus.

Misdiagnosis of pheochromocytoma can be deadly, as beta blockers, often prescribed for hypertension, can lead to unopposed alpha-adrenergic receptor stimulation in the context of pheochromocytoma. Most mortality associated with diagnosed pheochromocytoma came from surgery and hypertensive crisis, but mortality has greatly improved.

==== Cardiovascular system ====
1. Hypertensive crisis: Pheochromocytoma-related hypertensive emergencies are one of the most feared clinical manifestations. Attacks are random and may occur secondary to a trigger (see Signs and Symptoms above) or spontaneously after a catecholamine surge. The prevailing symptom is elevated systolic blood pressure (> 200 mmHg) that is unresponsive to traditional treatment regimens and threatens end-organ damage. Patients require immediate, life-saving treatment to prevent further damage to other organs and/or death.
2. Myocardial ischemia/Infarction: A heart attack is often caused by a significant build-up of plaque (atherosclerosis) in the coronary vessels. Patients with pheochromocytoma present with myocardial infarctions despite an overall lack of plaque build-up, indicating a different mechanism for the myocardial infarction. Current research hypothesizes that the tumor secretes massive amounts of catecholamines, which directly interact with myocardial (heart) tissue and exert negative effects, including oxygen deprivation, leading to accelerated scarring and cell death.
3. Toxic myocarditis: Even in patients without myocardial damage, excessive catecholamines can result in abnormal ST changes on an ECG. Norepinephrine (a catecholamine) is hypothesized to result in damaged cardiac tissue by inhibiting coronary blood flow and depriving cells of oxygen, thus resulting in ischemic tissue. Fortunately, following tumor excision and the subsequent quelling of catecholamines, the damage has been proven reversible.
4. Cardiomyopathy: Pheochromocytomas have been implicated in various types of cardiomyopathy, including myocarditis (see above), dilated cardiomyopathy, and stress-induced or Takotsubo cardiomyopathy. As with the other cardiovascular-related complications, excess catecholamines are responsible for the increased myocardial burden and significant physiologic stress. Current literature indicates that most of the catecholamine-induced damage is reversible, thereby strengthening the argument for early and accurate diagnosis to allow for cardiac remodeling and prevent further destruction.
5. Arrhythmias: Sinus tachycardia is the most common abnormal heart rhythm associated with a pheochromocytoma and is experienced by patients as the feeling of a "fluttering heart" or palpitations. Many other tachyarrhythmias (fast heart rate) have also been reported.

==== Nervous system ====
1. Cerebrovascular accident (Stroke): Multiple reports have detailed transient ischemic attacks or strokes in patients with a pheochromocytoma. In a study of 130 patients with pheochromocytoma, 7 patients were diagnosed with a transient ischemic attack (the neurologic deficit completely resolved), and 3 patients experienced a stroke with persistent symptoms.
2. Headache: Headaches are one of the core clinical manifestations of a pheochromocytoma and can result in debilitating pain. The majority of studied patients reported their pain began and ended abruptly without warning and described the pain as a severe, bilateral throbbing (although the scale of severity was not published). While 71% of the studied patients reported headaches, just over 20% of the affected patients endorsed associated nausea, vomiting, photophobia, or phonophobia, which are typically associated with migraines.

==== Urinary system ====
1. Acute renal failure: Several reports have detailed rhabdomyolysis (rapid skeletal muscle breakdown) leading to acute kidney injury and the need for transient dialysis in the undiagnosed pheochromocytoma patient as their primary presenting symptom. Kidney failure is brought about by catecholamine-induced muscle injury. Norepinephrine causes vessels to narrow, thereby limiting blood flow and inducing ischemia.

Multiple organ dysfunction syndrome (MODS): Caused by an elevated inflammatory response, multiple organ dysfunction is a severe, life-threatening emergency with increasing mortality based on the number of systems involved. Pheochromocytoma-related MODS is associated with multiple organ failure, hyperthermia > 40 degrees Celsius, neurologic manifestations, and cardiovascular instability resulting in either hypo- or hypertension. In contrast to a hypertensive crisis, pheochromocytoma-associated MODS may not respond to traditional alpha-receptor agents and may require emergent surgical excision if clinical stability is not achieved.

== Genetics ==
Current estimates predict that upwards of 40% of all pheochromocytomas are related to an inherited germline susceptibility mutation. Of the remaining 60% of tumors, more than 30% are associated with a somatic mutation. Given the high association with genetic inheritance, the United States Endocrine Society recommends that all patients diagnosed with a pheochromocytoma undergo an evaluation with a genetic counselor to consider genetic testing. In the UK, eligibility for NHS-funded genetic testing is determined by criteria set by the NHS England Genomics service. The criteria in 2024 included all patients with paraganglioma and all patients with unilateral pheochromocytoma aged under 60. The most recent data indicates that there are 25 pheochromocytoma susceptibility genes; however, just 12 are recognized as part of a well-known syndrome. Determining the genetic status of a pheochromocytoma patient is crucial — each gene is inherited in a different pattern, associated with specific disease characteristics, and may respond more favorably to certain treatment options. Furthermore, early identification can guide physicians on screening recommendations for first degree relatives of patients with pheochromocytoma. There is no current consensus for how and when asymptomatic carriers (individual who has a genetic variant associated with pheochromocytoma, but no current evidence of disease) should be evaluated. Conversations should occur individually with the patient and their provider to develop a personalized screening plan, alternating between a biochemical (blood work) evaluation and whole-body imaging to monitor disease progression.

=== Pediatric considerations ===
Additional practices may help maintain the emotional and psychological well-being of the minor. Screening includes a multidisciplinary team (endocrinologist, oncologist, psychologist, geneticist, parent, and child) where the primary focus is supporting the child.

- A positive result from testing during family-observed days of celebration may mask the happiness associated with these events in the future.
- Testing one pediatric sibling at a time allows the family to narrow their focus when results are returned and support each sibling individually.
- A negative result may upset a child if their sibling was positive; an opportunity to ask questions and process results may be helpful.

=== Hereditary syndromes ===
The following table(s) detail the clinical characteristics of the well-known hereditary pheochromocytoma gene variants

Classic Pheochromocytoma Tumor Syndromes
	Gene	Inheritance	Penetrance	Metastatic Potential	1^{o} Disease Characteristics
MEN2	RET	Autosomal Dominant	40–50%	<5%	Medullary thyroid carcinoma, hyperparathyroidism, marfanoid habitus, pheochromocytoma
VHL	VHL	Autosomal Dominant	10–30%	5%	Renal cell carcinoma, pancreatic NET, retinal and CNS hemangioblastoma, pheochromocytoma
NF1	NF1	Autosomal Dominant	1–5%	12%	Neurofibromas, cafe-au-lait macules, lisch nodules, pheochromocytoma

MEN2 (Multiple Endocrine Neoplasia-2); VHL (von-Hippel Lindau); NF1 (Neurofibromatosis-1); NET (Neuroendocrine Tumor); CNS (Central Nervous System)

Hereditary Paraganglioma Syndromes (SDHx)
	Gene	Inheritance	Penetrance	Metastatic Potential	1^{o} Disease Characteristics
PGL1	SDHD	Autosomal Dominant Paternal Inheritance	90%	<5%	Head and neck paraganglioma, pheochromocytoma, gastrointestinal stromal tumor
PGL2	SDHAF2	Autosomal Dominant Paternal Inheritance	100%	Low	Head and neck paraganglioma
PGL3	SDHC	Autosomal Dominant	Inconsistent	Inconsistent	Pheochromocytoma, head and neck paraganglioma, gastrointestinal stromal tumor
PGL4	SDHB	Autosomal Dominant	30–50%	30–70%	Head and neck paraganglioma, pheochromocytoma, gastrointestinal stromal tumor
PGL5	SDHA	Autosomal Dominant	10–15%	Low	Pheochromocytoma, head and neck paraganglioma, gastrointestinal stromal tumor

SDHx (Succinate Dehydrogenase Subunit x)

Other Pheochromocytoma Gene Mutations
	Inheritance	Penetrance	Metastatic Potential	1^{o} Disease Characteristics
MAX	Autosomal Dominant	Inconsistent	<5%	Bilateral pheochromocytoma
TMEM127	Autosomal Dominant	Inconsistent	Low	Pheochromocytoma, head and neck paraganglioma

MAX (MYC Associated Factor X); TMEM127 (Transmembrane Protein 127)

=== Other gene variants ===
There have been several published case reports of other, rare pheochromocytoma-associated susceptibility genes:

1. Pacak–Zhuang Syndrome
  - Hypoxia-inducible factor 2 alpha (HIF2A)
  - Polycythemia
  - Duodenal somatostatinoma
  - Retinal and choroidal vascular changes
  - Paraganglioma/Pheochromocytoma
2. Pheochromocytoma and Giant Cell Tumor of Bone
  - H3 histone, family 3A (H3F3A), post-zygotic G34W
  - Pheochromocytoma/Paraganglioma
3. Carney Triad
  - Gastrointestinal stromal tumor
  - Pulmonary chondroma
  - Paraganglioma
4. Carney-Stratakis Syndrome
  - Gastrointestinal stromal tumor
  - Paraganglioma

Several additional gene variants have been described, but the provided information is inconsistent, and a consensus has not been reached in the community on whether these mutations are truly pheochromocytoma susceptibility genes.

== Diagnosis ==
=== Differential ===
The typical primary symptom is hypertension, which may be either episodic or continual. A diagnosis of pheochromocytoma should be suspected when the patient simultaneously presents with hypertension and the classic triad of heart palpitations, headaches, and profuse sweating.

If a person has the characteristic signs and symptoms of a pheochromocytoma and the decision is made to pursue additional biochemical (blood work) evaluation, the differential diagnosis is important as it is more likely to be something other than a pheochromocytoma given the relative frequency of 0.8 per 100,000 person-years.

While previously suggested "10% of pheochromocytoma can be malignant", this is obsolete, per the most recent classification of pheochromocytoma and paraganglioma by the World Health Organization (WHO) in 2022, thus all patients with phaeochromocytomas are currently considered to have a lifelong risk of metastases and therefore conceptually they are all considered of having 'malignant potential'.

The risk of metastasis ranges from ~5 to 15%. There is no single histological finding or biomarker to reliably predict metastatic disease, and multiparameter scoring systems have been proposed.

Differential Diagnosis of Pheochromocytoma by System (Note: Adopted from Lenders et al., Phaeochromocytoma. The Lancet. 366(9486); 665–675.)
Endocrine	Cardiovascular	Neurologic	Psychiatric	Other
Hyperthyroidism	Heart failure	Migraine	Anxiety	Porphyria
Carcinoid syndrome	Arrhythmias	Stroke	Panic disorder	Medications (Note: Monoamine oxidase inhibitors, clonidine withdrawal)
Hypoglycemia	Ischemic heart disease	Epilepsy	Substance ese (Note: Including but not limited to cocaine use)	
Menopausal syndrome	Baroreflex failure	Meningioma	Factitious disorder (Note: Misuse of over-the-counter medications such as pseudoephedrine that are sympathomimetics)	
Medullary thyroid carcinoma	–	POTS	–	

=== Biopsy as an important backup tool for diagnosis ===
Current guidelines recommend against performing biopsy (core needle biopsy/fine needle aspiration) on patients with phaeochromocytomas and paragangliomas (PPGLs), primarily due to concerns about serious complications or death resulting from catecholamine release. However, an international, multicentre, retrospective study has provided evidence on safety of biopsy in PPGLs. Zhang et showed the mortality and morbidity of serious complications on patients with PPGL receiving biopsy among 234 biopsy events, which indicated a mortality of 0·9% [95% CI 0·0–5·1] of 106 biopsies and morbidity of 1·7% [95% CI 0·5–4·3] among 233 biopsies regarding serious catecholamine-related complications. This study has challenged the current guideline to avoid biopsy in all PPGLs instead supporting a personalised, risk–benefit-based approach to perform a biopsy. It's essential for metastatic PPGL patients who has unremovable tumours as biopsied tissue can be utilised to multi-omics analysis for finding potential therapeutic target.

=== Biochemical evaluation ===
==== Gold standard ====
Elevated plasma free metanephrines is considered the gold standard diagnosis for pheochromocytoma. Over 10 studies have confirmed that the sensitivity and specificity of this test is 97% and 93% respectively; however, there is still concern for false positive results in the correct clinical scenario. When interpreting a biochemical analysis for pheochromocytoma, the provider must pay close attention to the (1) conditions of the collection, (2) all medications the patient is taking, and (3) their diet.

1. Conditions of Collection: Unlike many routine laboratory tests that can be drawn at a moment's notice, there are several recommendations that should be followed to ensure the ideal conditions and an accurate sample. Current research indicates that blood work should only be drawn after a patient has been resting supine (flat on their back) for 30 minutes before collection. Specific supine reference values should be used in this scenario. Ensuring these conditions is difficult and may be cost-prohibitive at most institutions. In these cases, a rested, supine draw can be repeated following a positive result in a seated position to eliminate false-positive results.
2. Pharmaceutical Interference: Many prescription, over-the-counter, and illicit substances can interfere with the proper collection of plasma metanephrines and lead to false-positive results. Providers should review a patient's medication list in detail and discuss whether temporarily discontinuing any of the interfering medications is possible. The most reported medications to result in falsely elevated metanephrines include: β-adrenoceptor blockers, phenoxybenzamine, tricyclic antidepressants, minoxidil, monoamine oxidase inhibitors, serotonin norepinephrine reuptake inhibitors (SNRI), and methyldopa. As the majority of these medications are commonly prescribed for psychiatric conditions, a conversation with the prescriber may be necessary to facilitate alternative therapeutic options while the patient is undergoing evaluation for a pheochromocytoma. After any possible prescription medications have been held, it is important to review any over-the-counter medications/supplements as well as the commonly used acetaminophen and pseudoephedrine cause false elevations in metanephrine levels. Finally, it is important to have open, non-judgmental discussions about the patient's recreational substance use. Amphetamines, nicotine, and cocaine can result in marked plasma norepinephrine levels.
3. Lifestyle and Diet: As with most lab work, the patient should refrain from eating (fasting) after midnight the night before their collection. However, there are further recommendations specific to a metanephrine collection, including abstaining from nicotine, alcohol, and exercise for at least 12 hours before their blood test Patients should also avoid catecholamine-containing foods (fruits, fruit drinks, chocolate, caffeine, tomatoes, beans, nuts, and potatoes) for a minimum of 24 hours before collection.

While the above (3) conditions are likely to contribute to false-positive results if not controlled for, any value greater than 3 to 4 times the upper reference limit of normal should be considered diagnostic for a pheochromocytoma.

==== Alternative tests ====
Twenty-four hour urinary metanephrines are an acceptable alternative if the plasma test is unavailable. Other additional biomarkers can be helpful to aid in the diagnosis of pheochromocytoma as well, most notable is Chromogranin A. In comparison to the specificity of elevated catecholamines in the pheochromocytoma patient, chromogranin A is a non-specific polypeptide that is high in a variety of neuroendocrine tumors. However, a 2006 report from Italy found that over 90% of studied pheochromocytoma patients demonstrated elevated chromogranin A levels. If metanephrine values are equivocal, chromogranin A can be used as an adjunct marker to predict the presence of a tumor.

Borderline elevated metanephrines present a diagnostic challenge to the physician — the first step is to repeat the labs, taking extra precautions to follow the gold standard diagnosis described above, including the conditions of collection, pharmaceutical interference, and any potential diet and lifestyle habits that could alter the results. If the offending medications cannot be discontinued or repeated labs remain the same, consider administering a clonidine suppression test. In the 1970s, the drug clonidine hydrocloride swept the market as a novel agent for hypertension; however, the reported side-effects (nausea, vomiting, drowsiness, dryness of the eyes and mouth, constipation, and generalized weakness) limit compliance and have vastly diminished prescriptions. While the adverse side-effects with clonidine are inconvenient, the most dangerous aspect of clonidine is withdrawal rebound hypertension — that is, when the medicine is abruptly discontinued, blood pressure may rapidly return or surpass the original value. However, a one-time, weight-based dose can be utilized in limited settings to help determine disease status. After fasting overnight, patients will present to their testing site for a baseline metanephrines blood draw and clonidine administration. They will remain supine for (3) hours, and a repeat blood draw will be taken. A positive result (indicating a pheochromocytoma) will occur if the plasma metanephrine levels remain elevated after clonidine is given. If the results are the same or fall, the test is negative and the patient does not have a pheochromocytoma. If a patient does not have a pheochromocytoma, they may become extremely hypotensive following clonidine. Patients should not depend on themselves for transport following this test.

Plasma methoxytyramine is a breakdown product of the catecholamine dopamine. Paragangliomas of the head and neck commonly secrete dopamine, but are referred to as "biochemically silent" because they do not cause the characteristic symptoms associated with a pheochromocytoma. However, methoxytyramine can be utilized to detect the tumors of the head and neck. Further research indicates that the biomarker is also a useful indicator of metastatic disease — which is the only current biochemical evidence of metastases to date.

==== Biochemical phenotypes ====
Structure of epinephrine

While diagnostic, laboratory values can also provide physician's with important information about the type, location, size, and associated tumor genotype. There are (3) major, well-recognized biochemical phenotypes that can be used by health care providers to direct patient care.

1. Adrenergic (Epinephrine and metanephrine)
  - More likely to indicate an adrenal tumor
  - When plasma metanephrine levels were elevated to greater than 15% of the combined levels of normetanephrine and metanephrine, an adrenal tumor or a recurrence of an adrenal tumor that had already been excised can be predicted
  - Patients are more likely to present with the classic, paroxysmal (episodic) symptoms described above
2. Structure of norepinephrine
  Noradrengeric (Norepinephrine and normetanephrine)
  - More likely to indicate an extra-adrenal tumor
  - Patients are more likely to present with continuous, persistent pheochromocytoma-related symptoms (hypertension and tachycardia) compared to those that are classically episode with an adrenergic phenotype
  - Common in patients with von-Hippel Lindau and succinate dehydrogenase subunit X genetic variants
3. Structure of dopamine
  Dopaminergic (Dopamine and 3-methoxytyramine)
  - More likely to indicate an extra-adrenal tumor of the head and neck
  - Patients are more likely to be asymptomatic; however, they may present with non-specific signs of nausea, vomiting, abdominal pain, diarrhea, and weight loss secondary to the stimulation of dopamine receptors throughout the gastrointestinal tract
  - Particularly prevalent in patients with succinate dehydrogenase subunit B genetic variants

Across both an adrenergic and a noradrenergic phenotype, the greater the sum of plasma or urinary concentrations of metanephrine and normetanephrine, the larger the expected tumor diameter.

=== Tumor localization ===
==== Anatomic imaging ====
Anatomic imaging refers to computed tomography (CT) [CAT scan] or magnetic resonance imaging (MR) scans. These imaging modalities serve to initially locate the tumor and provide detailed information about size, morphology, and structural relation to adjacent internal structures. Traditionally, a patient presents to their physician for symptoms concerning for a pheochromocytoma, which prompts a biochemical evaluation. If the results are positive, the patient is referred for anatomic imaging with a CT or MR scan. However, as anatomic imaging becomes more readily available, patients are referred to an endocrinologist after an incidental (unanticipated finding) adrenal nodule is found on a scan ordered for another reason.

While there has not been a consensus on whether CT or MR is the preferred imaging modality in pheochromocytoma, each method has its associated strengths and weaknesses. As CT expose the patient to ionizing radiation, MR is preferred in children and pregnant women. Furthermore, the intravenous contrast used in CT can cause kidney damage and should therefore be avoided in patients with pre-existing damage. However, patients who struggle with being in confined spaces for extended periods (claustrophobia) cannot often tolerate an MR as the machine is close-ended compared to the open-ended design of a CT. When patients become anxious and begin to move in the machine, this causes motion artifact, which occurs less in CT-based images.

Compared to CT and MR, ultrasound is not a preferred imaging modality and should be avoided in the pheochromocytoma patient. However, in specific patient populations where avoiding ionizing radiation is the top priority (children, pregnant women), ultrasound can be used as an adjunct method when MR may be unavailable or the patient is unable to complete the scan. Furthermore, if an acute adrenal hemorrhage is suspected in a pheochromocytoma patient, ultrasound is a quick, painless, radiation-less, and cheap modality for a "first-pass" before the above imaging modalities or surgery is used to confirm the diagnosis.

==== Functional imaging ====
The imaging modalities discussed below are for tumor characterization, confirmation of metastatic disease, and treatment planning — they are not used to discern tumor location or help the surgical team prepare for excision. For most pheochromocytoma patients, functional imaging will follow a CT or MR. If anatomic imaging only demonstrates an adrenal tumor without evidence of disease anywhere else in the body and the metanephrine levels are overtly elevated, functional imaging can be foregone in favor of prompt surgical excision. Over the last decade, there have been five functional techniques used to evaluate the pheochromocytoma patient (1) 18F-fluorodeoxyglucose positron emission tomography (^{18}F-FDG PET), commonly referred to as the PET scan, (2) iodine-123 meta-iodobenzylguanadine (^{123}I-MIBG), (3) 18F-flurodihydroxyphenylalanine (^{18}F-FDOPA),(4) 68Ga-DOTA coupled somatostatin analogs (^{68}Ga-DOTA),(5). 11C-Hydroxy ephedrine(HED-PET).

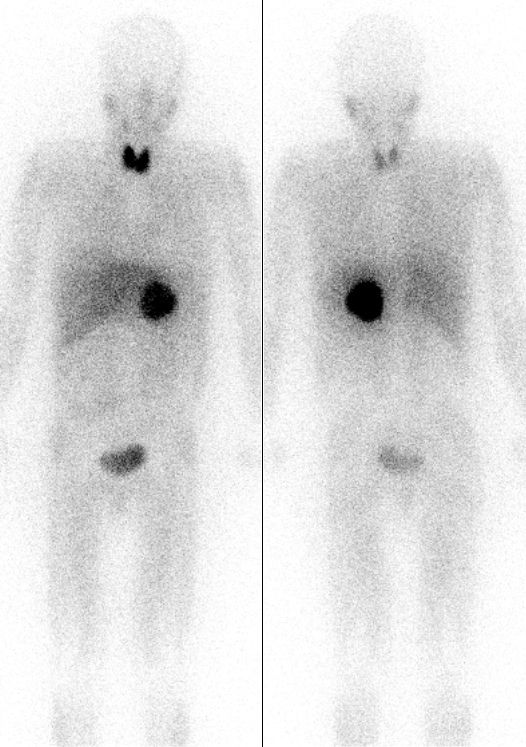
MIBG Scintigraphy — the pheochromocytoma is appreciated in the left panel on the right side of the screen (right panel; left side of the screen) as the darkened circle towards the abdomen. The darkened structure at the head of the patient is the thyroid gland, while the darkened structure in the pelvis of the patient is the bladder. This is normal physiologic uptake.

The first functional imaging technique utilized in pheochromocytoma patients was ^{123}I-MIBG scintigraphy. Given the compound's similar structure to the catecholamine norepinephrine (secreted by pheochromocytomas), MIBG was well-suited for uptake by most neuroendocrine tumors. Furthermore, if a patient was found to be positive on an MIBG scan, they were eligible for MIBG treatment, offering additional avenues for those with widespread metastatic disease. However, further investigation revealed that while MIBG excelled with adrenal lesions, it was far less superior in patients with extra-adrenal paragangliomas, particularly with specific genetic variants like those in the succinate dehydrogenase subunit–encoding genes (SDHx). As the positron emission tomography scans were developed, MIBG has slowly lost its favor for the pheochromocytoma patient.

FDG PET — the tumor is appreciated as the dark structure in the patient's left chest. The darkened structure at the head of the patient is the brain, posterior to the abdomen are the kidneys, and in the pelvis is the bladder. These are normal.

Of the four above mentioned modalities, ^{18}F-FDG PET is the most common and readily available functional imaging technique at most hospital systems, but the least-specific to neuroendocrine tumors (Image Left). In 2012, over 200 patients participated in a trial that compared the current gold standard of the time (MIBG/CT/MRI) to the novel FDG PET. Compared to its functional counterpart, FDG outperformed MIBG in detecting soft-tissue and bone metastases with higher specificity in patients with biochemically active tumors.

Following the development of FDG-PET, neuroendocrine-specific PET scans began to emerge. One of the first favorable imaging modalities was ^{18}F-FDOPA, which demonstrated a high sensitivity in detecting head and neck paragangliomas as well as non-metastatic disease outside of the head and neck. Unfortunately, in cases of metastatic disease, particularly related to succinate dehydrogenase subunit B (SDHB) mutations, ^{18}F-FDOPA fell inferior to the traditional FDG-PET. However, for patients with genetic variants in other pheochromocytoma-susceptibility genes (NF1, VHL, RET) ^{18}F-FDOPA has become the preferred radiopharmaceutical agent.

The newest PET modality involves somatostatin receptor type two receptor imaging with ^{68}Ga-DOTA analogues. Over the last decade, further research continues to indicate the superiority of this functional imaging modality in a wide range of clinical scenarios, even surpassing anatomic imaging (CT/MR) in pediatric patients with succinate dehydrogenase (SDHx) mutations. While FDOPA inconsistently detected metastatic disease, ^{68}Ga-DOTA analogues have demonstrated superior localization of metastatic pheochromocytoma. When directly compared in one head-to-head study in 2019, ^{68}Ga-DOTA analogues outperformed FDOPA, particularly in the detection of metastatic bone lesions. An additional benefit of the DOTA analogues is the ability for treatment with peptide receptor radionuclide therapy, which will be discussed in the treatment section below.

Also, HED-PET is an accurate tool to diagnose and rule out pheochromocytoma in complex clinical scenarios and to characterise equivocal adrenal tumours.

== Pathology ==
Paragangliomas and pheochromocytomas exhibit a characteristic nested (Zellballen), trabecular, or solid arrangement of tumor cells, with nests outlined by sustentacular cells that are best visualized using S100 immunostain. The tumor cells are typically large, polygonal, and uniform but may also display extensive vacuolation. The cytoplasm is abundant and finely granular, ranging in coloration from red to purple. Pigmented granules containing hemosiderin, melanin, neuromelanin, and lipofuscin may also be observed. Nuclei can vary extensively in size and shape, presenting as round to oval with prominent nucleoli.

Immunohistochemical Markers Immunohistochemistry (IHC) plays a critical role in diagnosing pheochromocytomas and paragangliomas. As pheochromocytomas and paragangliomas are composed of different types of cells, such as the chromaffin cells and sustentacular cells, different markers are used to identify each. Tumor cells commonly express neuroendocrine markers such as Chromogranin-A, Synaptophysin, and transcription factors like GATA3, which is particularly significant in identifying sympathoadrenal lineage tumors. Sustentacular cells express SOX10 and S100, with S100 protein being more widely distributed but less specific. Loss of sustentacular cells' markers can be indicative that the lesion is metastatic rather than primary pheochromocytoma or paraganglioma. Molecular markers associated with genetic variants are also utilized in the diagnostic workup. Loss of SDHB staining is indicative of SDHx-related pathogenesis and is particularly noted in tumors with SDHB pathogenic variants. Inhibin A can be a useful marker in identifying tumors driven by hypoxia signaling pathways, such as those with HIF2α mutations. Carbonic anhydrase 9 (CAIX) is employed to assist in diagnosing tumors associated with VHL mutations. Other markers include tyrosine hydroxylase (TH) and dopamine beta-hydroxylase (DBH), both critical in confirming catecholamine-producing tumors. Choline acetyltransferase (ChAT) is noted in parasympathetic paragangliomas, while Ki67 is used to assess proliferative activity and predict the metastatic potential of these tumors.

== Treatment ==
=== Surgery ===
Surgical resection is the only curative option for pheochromocytoma as of 2019. A successful excision is a multidisciplinary effort involving the endocrinologist and the patient pre-operatively (discussed below) and the surgical team and anesthesiologist intraoperatively. Without frequent and adequate communication between all of the above-mentioned teams, a favorable outcome is much more difficult. The United States Endocrine Society 2014 Clinical Practice Guideline for pheochromocytoma recommend a laparoscopic adrenalectomy (minimally invasive technique) for most adrenal tumors, unless they are invasive or are larger than 6.0 centimeters. A 2018 systematic review suggests that laparoscopic retroperotenial adrenalectomy appears to reduce late morbidity, time to oral fluid or food intake and time to ambulation when compared to laparoscopic transperitoneal adrenalectomy, however there is uncertainty about these effects due to very low-quality evidence. For outcomes such as all-cause mortality, early morbidity, socioeconomic effects, and operative and postoperative parameters, the evidence is uncertain about the effects of either intervention over the other.

Larger tumors, even for those larger than 6.0 cm, can be attempted with a minimally invasive approach, but the team should be prepared to convert to an open procedure if necessary. An open procedure (traditional surgical technique) is currently preferred for extra-adrenal disease, unless the tumor is small, non-invasive, and in an easy to maneuver location. While previous data indicated the need for a minimally invasive approach with malignant and/or metastatic disease, current research indicates a successful operation is feasible and results in a shorter hospital stay. Literature within the last decade has also demonstrated that the robotic technique may be successfully utilized for adrenal tumors.

Typically, complete or total adrenalectomy is performed; however, a technique referred to as "cortical-sparing" can leave a remnant (piece) of the adrenal gland in hopes of avoiding lifelong steroid replacement if the left and right adrenal glands need to be removed. The issue is particularly important in patients with MEN and VHL-related disease, which has a higher chance of bilateral pheochromocytomas. The risk of leaving adrenal tissue is recurrent disease (tumor comes back). A 2019 cohort study reported that despite a 13% recurrent rate in patients who underwent a cortical-sparing adrenalectomy for pheochromocytoma, there was no decreased survival compared to their total adrenalectomy counterparts.

==== Pre-operative management ====
Arguably, the most important part of a pheochromocytoma surgical plan is an adequate pre-operative blockade. Excess catecholamines have been described as a dormant volcano, ready to erupt at any time, wreaking catastrophic havoc on the body. While an eruption can occur at any time, two of the most common triggers are anesthesia and direct tumor manipulation, making surgery one of the most dangerous times for a pheochromocytoma patient if not properly prepared. To help circumvent a catecholamine-crisis, the United States Endocrine Society recommends that all patients with functional (hormonally active) tumors be started on a pre-operative alpha-adrenoceptor blockade a minimum of seven days before surgery. Modern pre-treatment results in excellent intra-operative blood pressure control for most patients. There are several medication options depending on the clinical scenario, each with its own associated strengths and weaknesses.

===== Alpha blockade =====
If the patient's blood pressure is moderately elevated, a selective, short-acting alpha-1 adrenoceptor antagonist (doxazosin, prazosin, terazosin) is the preferred agent. However, the patient should be warned about the potential side-effect known as "the first-dose phenomenon." When patients are initially exposed to one of the above agents, they may become lightheaded, dizzy, and nauseous, particularly when transferring from a seated to standing position due to a rapid decrease in blood pressure. These effects will decrease with time, but providers can try to avoid them by starting at a low dose and slowly increasing until they reach their desired amount. In patients with uncontrolled hypertension, the non-selective alpha-1 and 2 adrenoceptor antagonist (phenoxybenzamine) should be utilized. Unfortunately, compared to the selective agents listed above, phenoxybenzamine is much more expensive and may not be readily available to some patients. Common side effects include dry mouth, nasal congestion, and impaired male ejaculation, all of which do not cease with time and may limit patient compliance. While uncommon, patients may have a hormonally-active pheochromocytoma and a normal blood pressure. One comparison from 2014 found that a small dose of a calcium-channel blocker (such as amlodipine) may be used pre-operatively in some people. This will not drastically lower the patient's blood pressure and make them hypotensive, but it will assist the surgical and anesthesia teams if there is hemodynamic instability during the operation.

===== Beta blockade =====
An elevated heart rate (tachycardia) and the feeling of a racing heart (palpitations) may follow after initiating an alpha-adrenoceptor antagonist. If that is the case, a beta-adrenoceptor antagonist is then prescribed to control the heart rate. Just as with the alpha antagonists, there are selective (beta-1) and non-selective (beta-1 and beta-2) adrenoceptor antagonists. The selective agents (atenolol, metoprolol) are preferred to the non-selective agents (propranolol). There are several (labetalol, carvedilol) combined alpha-beta-adrenoceptor antagonists. These agents should be avoided whenever possible as there is upwards of seven times more beta-adrenoceptor antagonism than alpha, which can worsen hypertension and lead to a catecholamine crisis.

===== Complications =====
Beta-adrenoceptor antagonists should not be given alone in a pheochromocytoma patient — this can lead to severe consequences. In 1995, a team of physicians from London described the death of a person who had been recently diagnosed with pheochromocytoma after initiation of propranolol, a non-selective beta blocker. She quickly developed a hypertensive crisis leading to shock, myocardial infarction, heart failure, and dense right hemiplegia. Despite attempts at resuscitation, the person died several days later. This complication is related to the impact that alpha and beta-adrenoceptor antagonists have on blood vessels combined with the actions of catecholamines. The normal blood vessel is open, allowing for adequate blood flow. When catecholamines activate the alpha receptor, the vessel constricts (gets smaller), which results in hypertension. However, when catecholamines activate the beta receptor, the blood vessel dilates (gets larger) and allows for increased blood flow, reducing the blood pressure. If a pheochromocytoma patient is only started on a beta-adrenoceptor antagonist, this reverses the protective vasodilation and worsens the patient's hypertension.

===== Controversy =====
While the pre-operative alpha and beta blockade discussed above is overwhelmingly recognized as the standard of care, particularly in the United States, there has been discussion at the international level about whether alpha-blockade is necessary. In 2017, a team of researchers from Germany published an observational case series that called into question the current recommendations for alpha-blockade. The study examined the intraoperative maximal systolic arterial pressure in people with and without alpha-adrenoceptor blockade and found no difference in complications between the two groups. The following year, a group from France published a similar article with a warning against waiting an entire week to begin alpha-blockade. The French researchers called for immediate surgical intervention and consideration of steps to mitigate any intraoperative catecholamine crisis. These articles resulted in rebuttals from research teams in the United States, but an international consensus has not yet been reached.

==== Perioperative fluid status ====
Excess catecholamines cause a decrease in the total blood volume, making a patient vulnerable to hypotension during the operation. Therefore, a high-sodium diet with adequate fluid intake should be encouraged prior to surgery. Some institutions in the United States will even admit patients the night prior to surgery for intravenous fluid replacement starting at midnight until the time of the operation. However, a small trial from 2009 reported no difference in mortality in patients treated with preoperative intravenous fluids compared to those who did not.

In a 2010 survey of 40 endocrinologists by researchers at the Cedars-Sinai Medical Center in Los Angeles, California, nearly all indicated the importance of preoperative volume resuscitation (having the patient take in plenty of fluids before surgery). However, after reviewing their patient data, over 60% of the same physicians failed to discuss salt-loading and adequate hydration. When the patients were stratified by age, those that were younger received the advice to hydrate, but older patients did not. It was hypothesized that the providers chose to forego volume repletion in the older patient population for fear of their potential comorbidities (heart failure) where excess fluid is dangerous. While there is still no recognized consensus or gold standard, providers should individualize the decision based on the patient's perceived nutritional standing, volume status, comorbidities, and ability to self-hydrate.

==== Post-operative management ====
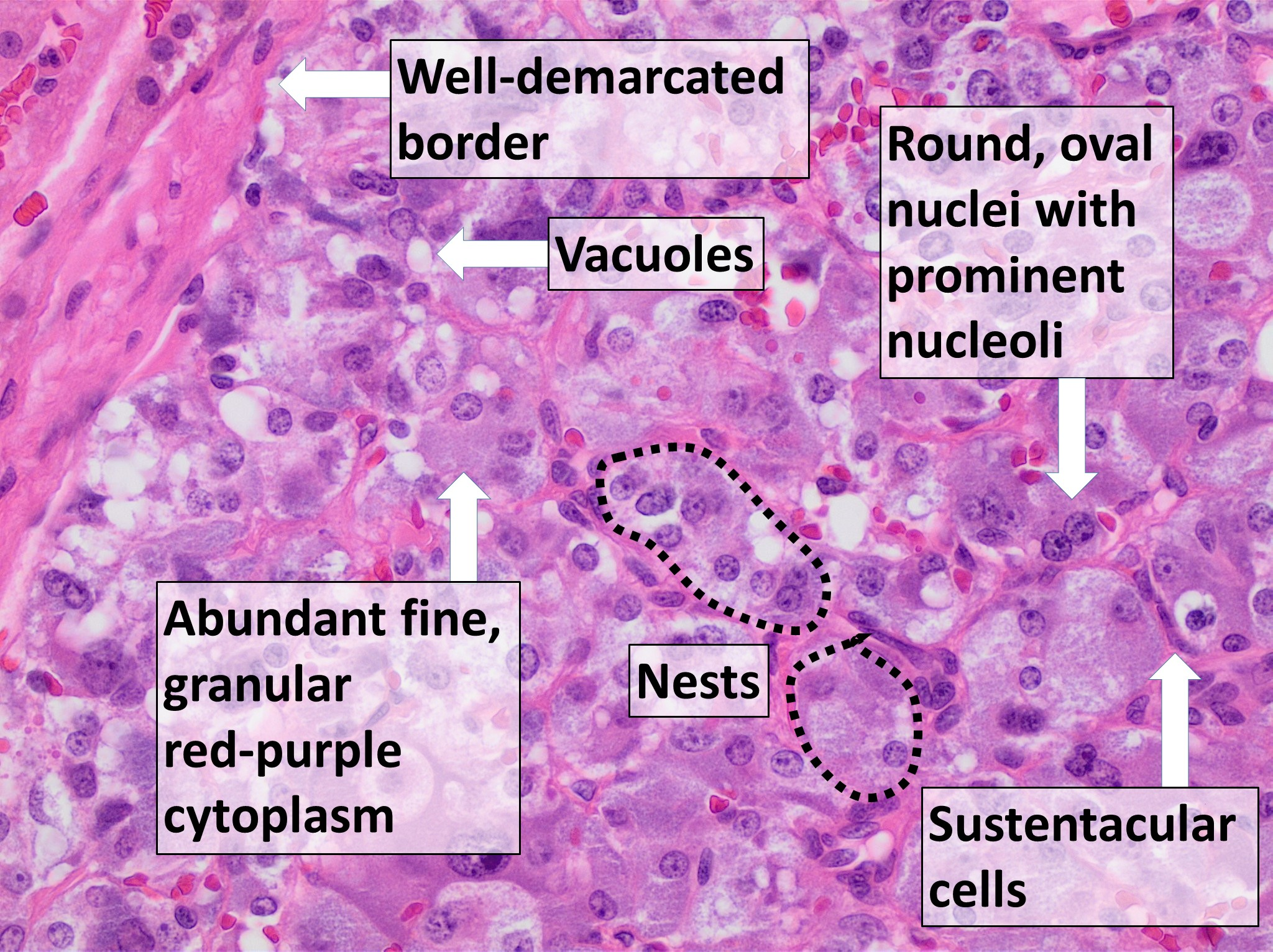
Histopathology on the resected tumor confirms the diagnosis, by typical features as shown

The most common post-operative complications, likely causes, and treatment options are:

Cardiovascular

1. Hypertension: In the pheochromocytoma patient, postoperative hypertension could indicate incomplete tumor resection or another tumor of unknown location. However, the traditional, non-specific causes of postoperative hypertension, including pain, fluid overload, and essential hypertension must also be considered. A perioperative hypertensive crisis is first treated with a 5.0 milligram (mg) intravenous bolus of phentolamine, with additional 5.0 mg dose every ten minutes until the blood pressure falls within an acceptable range. If the blood pressure is only minimally elevated, the patient can resume their alpha and beta-adrenoceptor antagonist from before surgery.
2. Hypotension: There are several reasons a patient may have low blood pressure in the post-operative period. First and foremost, the tumor (and its abundance of catecholamines, causing high blood pressure) has been removed. Furthermore, the patient may still experience the effects of their alpha-adrenoceptor antagonist, which causes lower blood pressure. First-line treatment for postoperative hypotension is aggressive fluid resuscitation, which is why ensuring the patient is well-hydrated (see above) before surgery is so imperative. Vasopressors may be needed if the blood pressure does not respond to fluids.

Endocrine

1. Hyperglycemia: Catecholamines prevent the secretion of insulin — a hormone responsible for lowering the body's blood glucose (sugar). Blood glucose levels should be checked frequently in the perioperative period, and insulin should be given as needed if levels are elevated. Following resection, tumor-related hyperglycemia is likely to resolve.
2. Hypoglycemia: After the tumor is removed, insulin is no longer inhibited, which can bring the blood glucose dangerously low. Symptoms include tremor, anxiety, palpitations, sweating, altered mental status (confusion), dizziness, and blurred vision. A retrospective analysis of beta blocker found that some beta blocker use may cause people to be more prone to hypoglycemia and not experience these symptoms, which could delay the diagnosis.
3. Adrenal Insufficiency: Following a bilateral adrenalectomy (left and right), the patient is no longer capable of secreting the necessary hormones to keep their body functioning. Life-long steroid (hydrocortisone and fludrocortisone) oral supplementation may be required to ensure they do not develop adrenal insufficiency. When the body is stressed (during surgery), the adrenal glands naturally produce more steroids; however, if the glands have been removed, they are unable to do so. Therefore, "stress-dosing" steroids are required and should be started intraoperatively to mimic the natural physiology of the adrenal glands. The typical regimen when post-operative adrenal insufficiency is thought to be likely:
  1. 50 milligram (mg) intravenous hydrocortisone in the operating room prior to anesthesia
  2. Repeat administration of 25–50 mg intravenous hydrocortisone every eight hours for a maximum of 72 hours (3 days) after the operation. Convert to oral replacement therapy as soon as the patient can take medication by mouth
  3. Patients should be transitioned to a normal maintenance (regular, daily) dose of steroids before discharge and referred to endocrinology for proper titration and management. Depending on the patient's total body surface area, the total typical daily dose of hydrocortisone is between 15 and 25 mg daily (divided into morning and afternoon pills).
  4. Those who have lost both their adrenal glands will also require another steroid (mineralcorticoid replacement). The typical daily dose is between 50 and 200 micrograms of fludrocortisone

There have been many other reported complications (renal failure, heart failure, intestinal pseudo-obstruction) following tumor resection. However, the above are more likely to be encountered, which is why their management has been specifically outlined here in this article.

== Metastatic disease ==
=== Diagnosis and location ===
Metastatic pheochromocytoma is defined as the presence of tumor cells (chromaffin tissue) where they are not normally found. Patients with a paraganglioma are more likely to develop metastases than those with a pheochromocytoma. The most common extra-adrenal sites of metastases are the lymph nodes, lung, liver, and bone. There have been several studied risk factors associated with the development of metastatic disease — while the patients genetic background plays an important role, the initial age of presentation and size of the tumor lead to negative outcomes. Of all the genetic variants, succinate dehydrogenase subunit B (SDHB) mutations have the highest rates of developing metastatic disease. Another study has reported increased mortality associated with male sex and synchronous metastases. Metastases are divided into synchronous and metachronous; those that are synchronous have developed within several months of the primary tumor, while metachronous metastases do not appear for a significant period.

Laparoscopic approach to the original disease, especially in large tumors, has been identified as an important risk factor for tumoral seeding.

Despite all of the potential treatment options, recent literature highlights that (for most patients) metastatic pheochromocytoma is slow-growing. In patients with minimal disease burden, a "watch and wait" approach with frequent imaging to monitor disease is favorable, withholding treatment until evidence of progression is visualized.

=== Treatment ===
Metastatic pheochromocytoma is best managed with a multidisciplinary team of oncologists, surgeons, radiologists, nuclear medicine physicians, and endocrinologists. There are several treatment options available to patients depending on the amount and location of disease:

Surgery — Normally, the goal of surgery is complete cytoreductive surgery; leave no remnant of disease. However, with widespread metastatic disease, this is not always feasible. Therefore, a surgical debulking procedure is performed (removing as much of the cancerous tissue as possible) to reduce patient symptoms by removing the source of catecholamines, improve response to chemo or radionuclide therapy, or simply decrease the size of the tumor. Unfortunately, the intended relief from the procedure is often short-lived, especially if the patient has disease outside the abdomen. A 2013 study from the National Institutes of Health reported that a majority of patients with recurrent biochemical evidence of disease within one year of the operation and less than 30% continued to be biochemically free of disease after five years.

In contrast to an operation for non-metastatic disease, an open procedure may be preferred over a minimally invasive technique to circumvent potential tumor spread. This also aids surgical visualization and offers the best opportunity to identify and remove metastatic lymph nodes. Reports have also indicated the utility of administering a radionuclide agent like iodine-123 meta-iodobenzylguanadine (^{123}I-MIBG) prior to surgery and then scanning the patient intraoperatively with a probe to detect disease that may be missed with the naked eye.

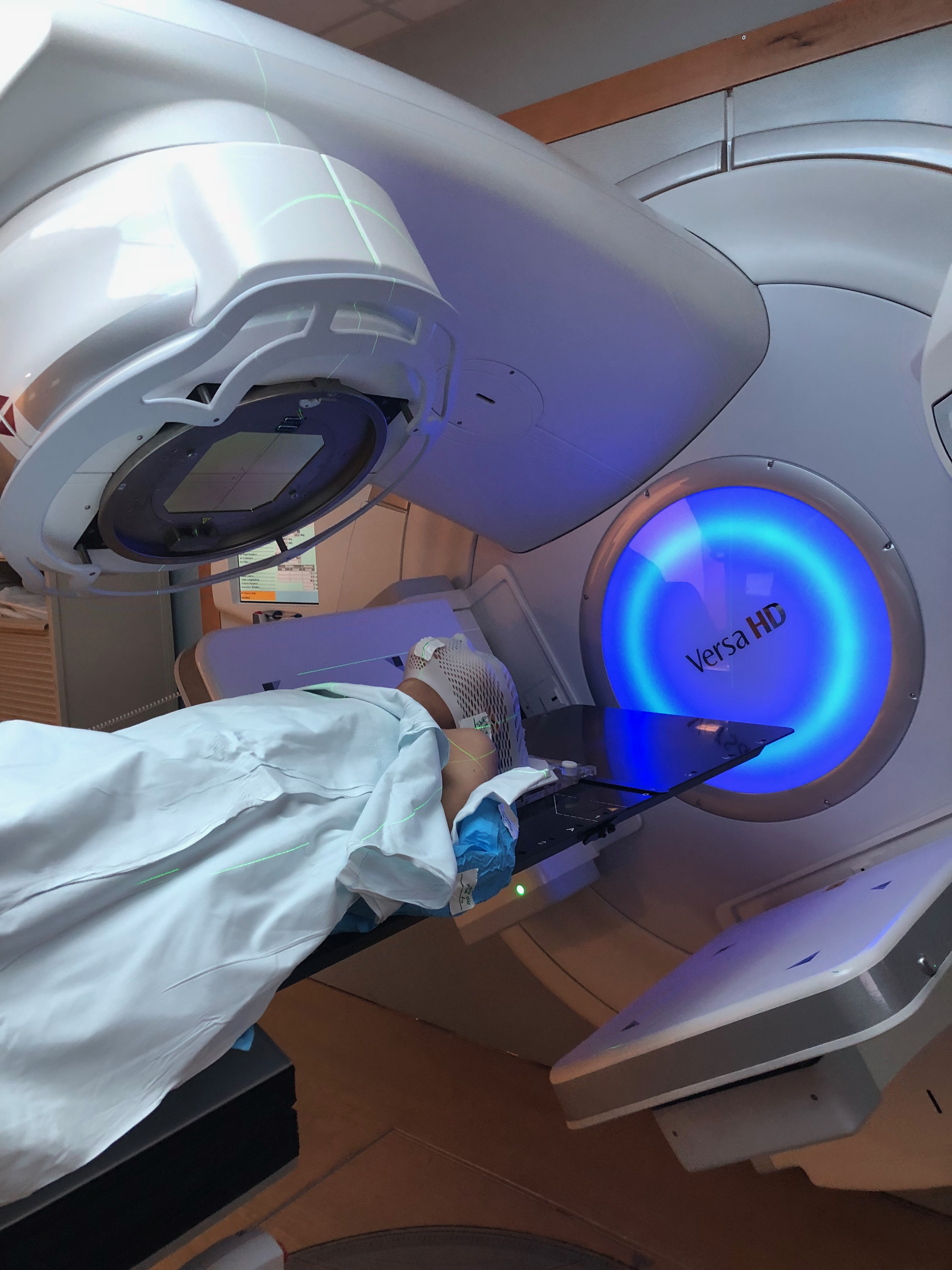
Patient receiving radiation therapy to the region of the head and neck. Full facial mold is in place to protect areas where they do not want exposure.

Radiation Therapy — With regard to pheochromocytoma, radiation techniques are primarily used for pain control, specifically with regards to bone metastases, local control of the disease, and to limit spinal cord compression. A multidisciplinary team from the Mayo Clinic retrospectively reviewed all of their patients who underwent external beam radiation therapy from 1973 to 2015 and reported that 94% of patients acknowledged symptomatic improvement and over 80% of patients showed no evidence of recurrent disease five years post-therapy. Another report from the same institution looked at almost two decades of patients who underwent radiofrequency ablation, cryoablation, or percutaneous ethanol injection for metastatic pheochromocytoma and reported that local control was achieved in over 85% of targeted lesions and that 92% of procedures were associated with reduced pain and/or symptoms of catecholamine excess.

Chemotherapy — The most common chemotherapy regimen for metastatic pheochromocytoma is cyclophosphamide, vincristine, and dacarbazine, collectively known as CVD. Response to therapy is measured by a reduction in total tumor volume as well as symptomatic relief, reported by the patient. A systematic review and meta-analysis of unstratified pheochromocytoma patients who underwent CVD therapy showed that 37% of patients had a significant reduction in tumor volume, while 40% of patients experienced lower catecholamine burden. While there was no difference in overall survival between patients whose tumors shrunk versus those without a response (no reduction in tumor burden via imaging), even in non-responders, patients reported feeling better, blood pressure was lower, and some patients were even able to undergo surgery following disease stabilization with CVD. When patients are studied by various categories, research has suggested that females are less likely to have extended survival with CVD chemotherapy compared to their male counterparts. Genetic status has been shown to greatly impact response to CVD. A team of researchers from the National Institutes of Health reported that patients with succinate dehydrogenase subunit B (SDHB) mutations are not only more likely to initially respond to CVD, but that they also experienced over 30 months of progression-free survival (time until tumor returned) with continued administration.

However, CVD is not the only proven chemotherapeutic regimen in the pheochromocytoma patient. A 2018 report demonstrated the remarkable response of two SDHB patients who failed CVD chemotherapy (disease progressed despite medication), but were then treated with temozolomide (TMZ) and had progression free survival of 13 and 27 months, indicating that TMZ can be considered as an alternative treatment regimen in those who have progressed on CVD. Several studies have since reported successful responses with TMZ, particularly in the SDHB sub-population.

Tyrosine Kinase Inhibitor

Tyrosine kinase inhibitors (TKIs) have been explored as therapeutic options for metastatic pheochromocytoma and paraganglioma, targeting VEGF-driven angiogenesis, particularly in cluster 1 tumors. Sunitinib demonstrated a partial response rate of 17% with a median progression-free survival (PFS) of 4.1 months and a lower risk of progression in patients with SDHB pathogenic variants as observed in the FIRSTMAPPP trial. Common side effects included hypertension and cardiovascular complications necessitating antihypertensive pre-treatment. Cabozantinib, assessed in the NATALIE trial, showed a 25% objective response rate and a 93.75% disease control rate with a median PFS of 16.6 months and overall survival (OS) of 24.9 months, but hypertension, fatigue, and diarrhea were frequently reported. Lenvatinib and pazopanib exhibited limited efficacy and significant toxicities in phase 2 trials, while Axitinib achieved a 35.3% partial response rate and a median PFS of 7.9 months in a small trial, though hypertension occurred in 79% of patients. Anlotinib, in a cohort of 37 patients with metastatic and unresectable PPGL, produced a 44.4% partial response rate and a 96.3% disease control rate over a median follow-up of 13.5 months, with hypertension, malaise, and palmar-plantar erythrodysesthesia being the most common adverse events. Combining anlotinib with radionuclide therapy resulted in a 100% disease control rate during the follow-up period.

Radionuclide Therapy

- Iodine-131 meta-iodobenzylguanadine (MIBG)
  - As was mentioned in the functional imaging section above, MIBG is not only useful in locating the presence of metastatic disease, but also as an available treatment modality. In 2019, a multi-center phase 2 trial looked at the safety and efficacy of MIBG therapy in metastatic or unresectable (not conducive to surgery) pheochromocytoma patients, and the results were promising. Median overall survival was 36.7 months, and 92% of patients had at least a partial positive response (tumor shrinkage) or stable disease without progression within the first year of the study. Furthermore, over a fourth of the patients could decrease their anti-hypertensive medications and reported symptomatic improvement. There are several patients who are not eligible for MIBG treatment, including pregnant women (radiation exposure is harmful to the fetus), women who are actively breast feeding, patients in renal failure, and those are who not expected to live longer than three months. As MIBG therapy can destroy the thyroid, protective medications (potassium iodide) are started before treatment and need to be continued for at least three weeks after therapy concludes. Associated side effects (muscle weakness, nausea, vomiting and hematologic (blood) toxicities, are common, but often minimal, and can be mitigated with slow, steady dosing.

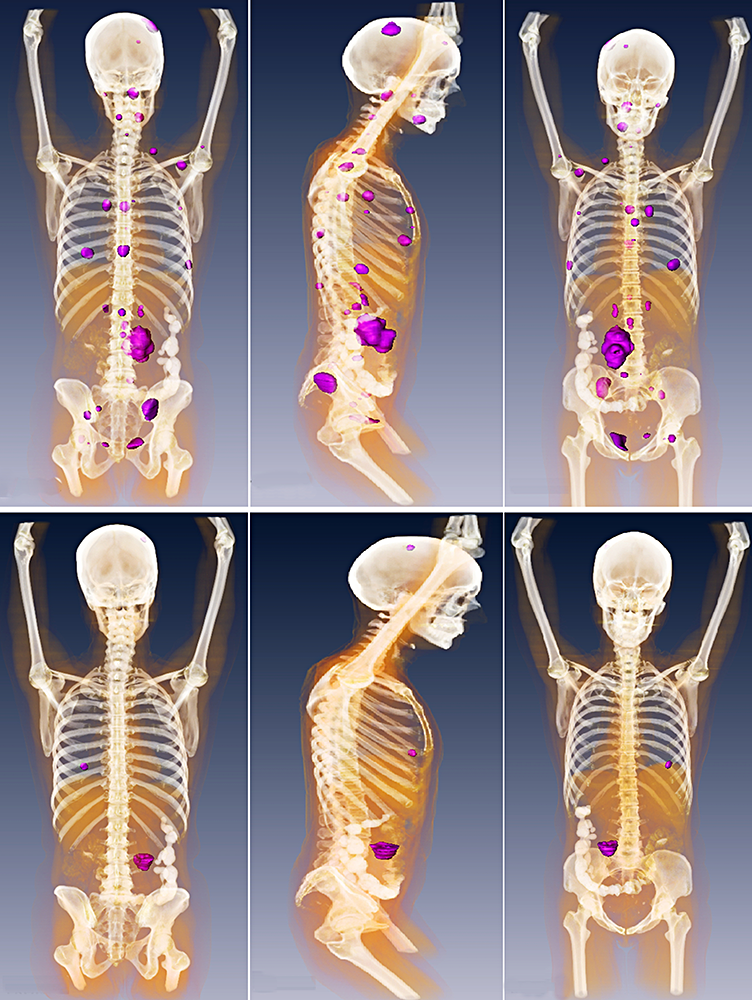
Top: Purple lesions are metastatic disease detected with DOTATATE imaging. Bottom: Same patient. Purple lesions are metastatic disease detected with FDG PET

- Peptide Receptor Radionuclide Therapy (PRRT)
  - The newest of the treatment options, PRRT, utilizes the 68-Ga DOTA analogues mentioned above in the functional imaging section. Treatment with ^{177}Lu-DOTATATE first demonstrated success in patients with undifferentiated neuroendocrine tumors and then trials began with metastatic pheochromocytoma patients. In 2019, Vyakaranam et al. published favourable results for their 22 patients who underwent PRRT, with partial response in 2 patients and stable disease (no progression) in the remaining 20 patients. Overall toxicity was low, with no high-grade haematological (blood) or kidney damage reported. At the end of that same year, a systemic review looked at all published articles (12) where metastatic pheochromocytoma patients underwent PRRT and found that treatment-related adverse events are minimal, with only 5 out of 102 patients choosing to voluntarily initiate treatment discontinuation. Newer reports have detailed the utility of combining ^{90}Y-DOTATATE with the traditionally studied ^{177}Lu analog and the various possibilities and novel treatment options these combinations will bring to the field. While the overall reported side-effects have been promising, a collaborative effort between the National Institutes of Health and Radboud University Medical Centre reported two unfortunate cases of rapid disease progression following a remarkable, almost complete response to PRRT. While the etiology of their recurrence is unknown, the team speculated that an elevated tumor marker (Ki-67) could be an indication of a poor response to PRRT and called for pre-PRRT assessments to include Ki-67 values to help individualize patient treatment plans.

Target Therapies Targeted therapies have emerged as promising treatment options in the management of pheochromocytoma and paraganglioma, particularly for tumors driven by specific pathogenic variants. Belzutifan, a hypoxia-inducible factor 2-α (HIF2α) inhibitor, has demonstrated significant clinical benefit in tumors with EPAS1 pathogenic variants. By targeting the HIF2-α pathway, belzutifan effectively reduces catecholamine levels, stabilizes tumor growth, and mitigates symptoms such as hypertension and tachyarrhythmias, particularly in patients with Pacak-Zhuang syndrome, where EPAS1 gain-of-function mutations are prevalent, with a relatively tolerable profile.

In May 2025, the U.S. Food and Drug Administration approved the HIF-2α inhibitor belzutifan (Welireg) as the first oral systemic treatment for adults and adolescents (≥ 12 years) with locally advanced, unresectable, or metastatic pheochromocytoma or paraganglioma. Approval was based on the phase-II LITESPARK-015 trial, which demonstrated a 26 % objective response rate and a median response duration of 20.4 months. Some patients may experience dose-related anemia, and hypoxia.

Another targeted agent, Selpercatinib, a RET proto-oncogene kinase inhibitor, has shown efficacy in RET-driven tumors, including those associated with multiple endocrine neoplasia type 2 (MEN2). The expanding landscape of targeted therapies provides new avenues for individualized treatment strategies, particularly in genetically defined subgroups of pheochromocytoma and paraganglioma, where traditional systemic therapies have limited efficacy.

== Prognosis ==
According to the National Cancer Institute, prognosis is defined as the likely outcome of a disease, or the chance of recovery or a recurrence. This is an extremely difficult question when it comes to pheochromocytoma, and the answer depends on the patient's genetic status, presence of metastatic disease, and the location of their primary tumor. An article about prognosis published in 2000 reported a 91% 5-year survival rate in their patient population; however, over 86% of their patients had sporadic tumors (no known genetic mutation), which commonly have low malignant potential. In 2019, a consortium of almost twenty European medical centers looked at the prognosis of malignant pheochromocytoma. The data starkly vary from the report of sporadic, single tumors, with a median survival of 6.7 years. Overall survival improved if the patient had disease of the head and neck compared to abdomen, was less than 40 years of age, and if their biochemistry was less than five times the upper reference limit of normal.

Recent literature has detailed several factors that predict accelerated progression of disease and higher mortality rates, including patients who choose to forego surgical resection of their primary tumor, larger tumors at initial presentation, older age at initial diagnosis, and a shortened time from primary tumor to presence of metastases. The actual location of the metastases can also indicate prognosis, with osseous lesions (bone) faring better than their soft-tissue (lung, liver) counterparts.

== Epidemiology ==
According to the North American Neuroendocrine Tumor Society, the prevalence of pheochromocytoma is between 1:2,500 and 1:6,500, meaning that for every 2,500–6,500 people, there is (on average) one person with pheochromocytoma. In the United States, this equates to an annual incidence (new cases per year) of 500 to 1,600 cases. However, approximations in the early 2000s reported that upwards of 50% of pheochromocytoma diagnoses are at autopsy; therefore, the above estimations may be lower than expected. In a 50-year autopsy case series, the Mayo Clinic reviewed 54 pheochromocytoma cases between 1928–1977 and discovered that just 24% of the patients were correctly diagnosed prior to their death. Outside of the United States, several countries have documented their own epidemiological studies and compared them to what is known in North America. In the first national, epidemiological population-based study in Asia utilizing Korean National Health Insurance Service data, the prevalence of a pheochromocytoma was reported at 2.13 per 100,000 persons with an incidence of 0.18 per 100,000 person-years. This is lower than the occurrence reported from Rochester, Minnesota (0.8 per 100,000 person-years), in a study conducted from 1950 to 1979. However, the Netherlands also conducted a study using a nationwide registry and reported incidence results of 0.57 per 100,000 person-years from 2011 to 2015, which was a significant increase from their 0.37 cases per 100,000 person-years reported from 1995 to 1999. Current hypotheses for why the incidence of pheochromocytoma is growing in the Dutch population point to the advent of modern imaging evaluation and the ability to detect these tumors before death. While each of the above studies reported varying incidence and prevalence values, all have indicated that the average age at initial diagnosis is between the third to fifth decade of life. When younger patients are diagnosed with a pheochromocytoma, there should be a high suspicion for hereditary disease, as genetic anticipation (earlier disease onset with each generation) is associated with some mutations.

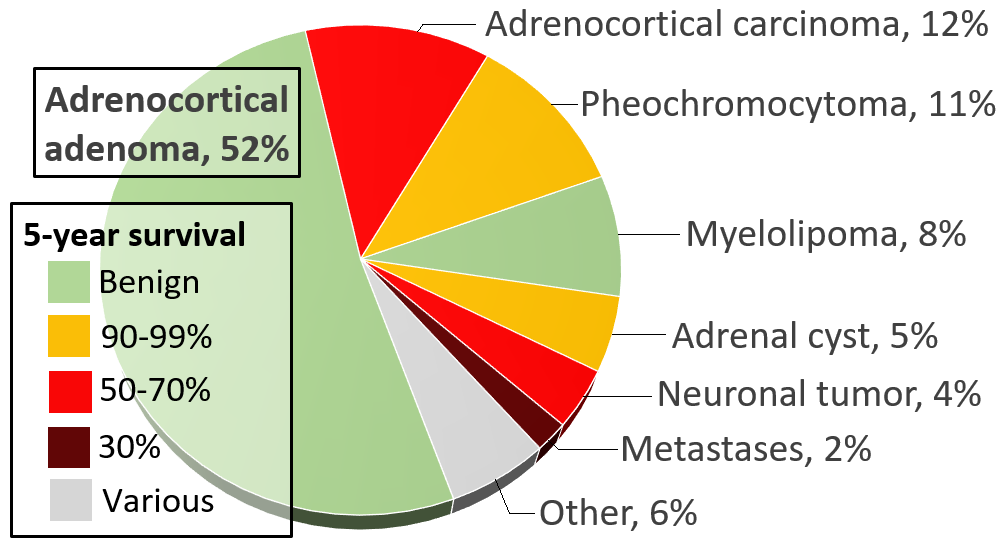
Likelihood of diagnosis when an adrenal-nodule is identified; pheochromocytoma is in yellow near the top-right corner.

Classically, the pheochromocytoma "rules of 10" have been taught, particularly to medical students:

- 10% of patients have malignant disease
- 10% of patients have bilateral (both left and right adrenal glands) disease
- 10% of patients have extra-adrenal (paraganglioma) disease
- 10% of patients have inherited (familial disease)

Despite the prominence in many respected textbooks, these guidelines have since been established as inaccurate and are not used in current epidemiological discussions.

As suggested above, incidental imaging has become a major player in the diagnosis of patients with pheochromocytoma, with current estimates that 10–49% of all cases diagnosed after imaging was obtained for another reason. When an adrenal nodule (potential tumor) is discovered on computed tomography or magnetic resonance imaging, there is a 5–10% chance the lesion is a pheochromocytoma. The incidence of adrenal tumors is found in the infographic above, with pheochromocytoma noted in yellow in the top right corner.

== History ==
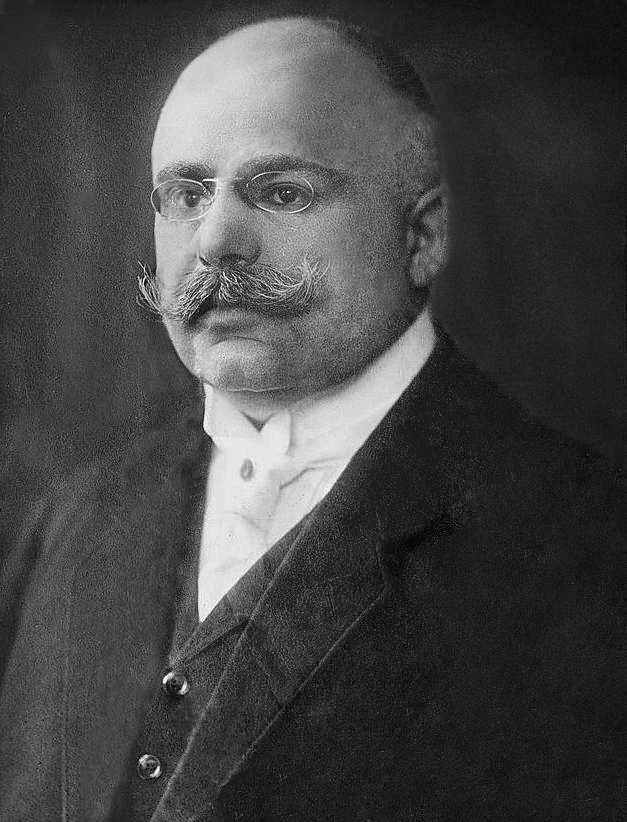
Professor Ludwig Pick, the German physician who first coined the term "pheochromocytoma" in 1912 after recognizing the color-change associated with the addition of chromium salts

Max Schottelius, pathologist who performed the first histological description of pheochromocytoma in 1886

In 1800, an Irish physician (Charles Sugrue) penned a case report to the London Medical and Physical Journal describing the peculiar case of an 8-year-old male patient who had had seemingly random fits of pain concentrated in the abdomen accompanied by "a hectic flush distinctly marked on each cheek" with a "constant profuse and universal perspiration." Following his death, a group of physicians performed an autopsy to determine cause of death and discovered a six-inch oblong tumor composed of an unknown "yellow-ish coloured substance" coming from the capsula renalis (what is now known as the adrenal gland). This would become the first known clinical description of a pheochromocytoma. Then in 1886, a German team of Felix Fraenkel, Max Schottelius and Rudoff Maier further described pheochromocytoma in a young woman who had died from severe hypertension and a heart attack. The woman had tumors in both adrenal glands. Schottelius completed the first histological description of the tumor, noting that the tumor turned brown when stained with Mueller's solutions; this would later be known as the chromaffin reaction. This characeristic reaction would be used to diagnose pheochromocytoma for much of the 20th century until being supplanted by immunohistochemical staining in the 1980s. Following the initial 1886 monograph by Fraenkel and colleagues describing "sarcoma and angio-sarcoma" in the 18-year-old female, a group of investigators led by Hartmut Neumann in 2007 traced the patient's family members and identified a pathogenic variant in the RET proto-oncogene (p.C634W), associated with Multiple endocrine neoplasia type 2.

While various physicians were recognizing symptoms and treating patients, Czech biologist Alfred Kohn reported his discovery of the paraganglia system, which would later become crucial to the diagnosis of these tumors. Furthermore, he also introduced the term "chromaffin," allowing pathologists to recognize tumors that arose from the adrenal gland.

In 1908, two pathologists, Henri Alezais and Felix Peyron, introduced the scientific community to "paraganglioma" after they discovered extra-adrenal tissue that reacted to chromium salts, which mimicked the reaction of the adrenal medulla. Just four years later, German pathologist Ludwig Pick coined the term "pheochromocytoma" after he observed the consistent color change in tumors associated with the adrenal medulla. Many surgeons attempted to remove these tumors over the next decade, but their patients died intraoperatively from shock. In 1926, Charles Mayo (a founder of the Mayo Clinic) became the first physician to successfully excise a pheochromocytoma. However, Mayo was likely unaware of the diagnosis before the operation. Not until 1929 was a pheochromocytoma recognized preoperatively. Throughout the early 1900s, the operative mortality rate for a pheochromocytoma ranged from 30 to 45%. Retrospective series have postulated that these alarmingly high death rates were due to the lack of a pre-operative blockade with alpha and beta-adrenoceptor antagonist and the need for modern anesthesia practices. From this point forward, physician-scientists have been recognizing patterns in patients with pheochromocytoma and identifying genetic associations and various syndromes.

== Society and culture ==
While a rare disease, there have been several references to pheochromocytoma in popular culture and the media, specifically medical television dramas. Additionally, there is a strong online patient advocacy community that works to connect patients with rare diseases and allows them to meet other individuals who are experiencing similar diagnoses and treatment strategies.

=== Zebra culture ===
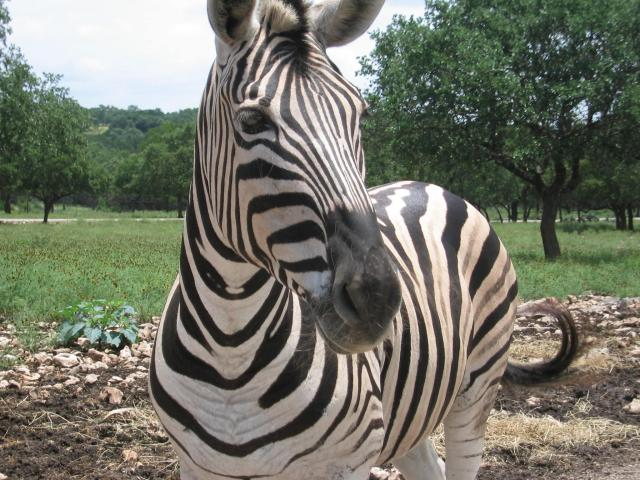
The zebra has become a powerful symbol in the pheochromocytoma advocacy community and represents the rare medical cases that are more likely to be misdiagnosed.

In the medical community, students are often taught "when you hear hoofbeats, think horses, not zebras." In other words, common diagnoses are common, so healthcare professionals should first rule out what is most expected (the horses) before diving into the rare etiologies that are far less likely to be correct (the zebras). However, the symbol of the zebra has become increasingly powerful to the rare disease community and resulted in several organizations, societies, and special events (Rare Disease Day) to draw attention to the least common option sometimes being the correct diagnosis.

The National Organization for Rare Disorders is a United States–based advocacy parent organization to promote awareness and research opportunities to cure rare diseases. Groups such as these encourage patients to become their advocates and change agents in their healthcare decision-making processes.

=== Media ===
In July 2012, an actual pheochromocytoma patient, Tannis Brown, former vice-president of the PheoPara Troopers, was featured on the Discovery Fit & Health Network program Diagnosis: Dead or Alive. The show highlighted her personal struggle with misdiagnosed disease as many physicians felt her episodic headaches and hypertension (high blood pressure) were related to stress.

In the seventh and eighth seasons of Grey's Anatomy, series regular Henry has a Von Hippel-Lindau (VHL) mutation that has resulted in a pheochromocytoma. The story arc was met with mixed opinions from the rare disease community. The executive director of the VHL Alliance was happy with the portrayal of a VHL patient in mainstream media, but pointed out that of the four scripts she knew of with a VHL patient, three involved a pheochromocytoma, which occurs in less than a fifth of all VHL patients.

A case of pheochromocytoma was featured in the first episode of season 2 of House, M.D.. Dr. House and his team are tasked with diagnosing and treating an inmate on death row. Although the patient has a violent history of homicide, Dr. House suspects that his episodic rage and aggression may be caused by an adrenaline secreting tumor. Dr. House is able to locate the tumor and diagnoses the patient with pheochromocytoma. Dr. Foreman, one of the doctors, attempts to appeal the inmate's death penalty on the basis that he was unable to control his actions due to his tumor. This kind of legal defense is rarely successful, however.

=== Famous People with Pheochromocytoma ===
President Dwight D. Eisenhower experienced several cardiovascular events, including a heart attack in 1955 and multiple strokes, alongside documented episodes of severe hypertension throughout his life. Despite extensive medical evaluation, the underlying cause of his erratic blood pressure remained undiagnosed until his death in 1969. Autopsy findings unexpectedly revealed a 1.5 cm pheochromocytoma in the left adrenal gland, suggesting that the tumor may have contributed to his hypertensive crises and potentially exacerbated his ischemic cardiomyopathy.

== Etymology ==
1920s: from phaeochrome (another term for chromaffin), from Greek phaios 'dusky' + khrōma 'color', + -cyte.
