= Metanephrines =

Norepinephrine breakdown, with normetanephrine visible at upper left.

The metanephrines are a group of molecules consisting of metanephrine and normetanephrine.

An article in the Journal of the American Medical Association, 2002, indicated that the measurement of plasma free levels of metanephrines is the best tool in the diagnosis of pheochromocytoma, an adrenal medullary neoplasm.
