= Adrenaline =

Hormone and medication

Epinephrine
- Skeletal formula of adrenaline

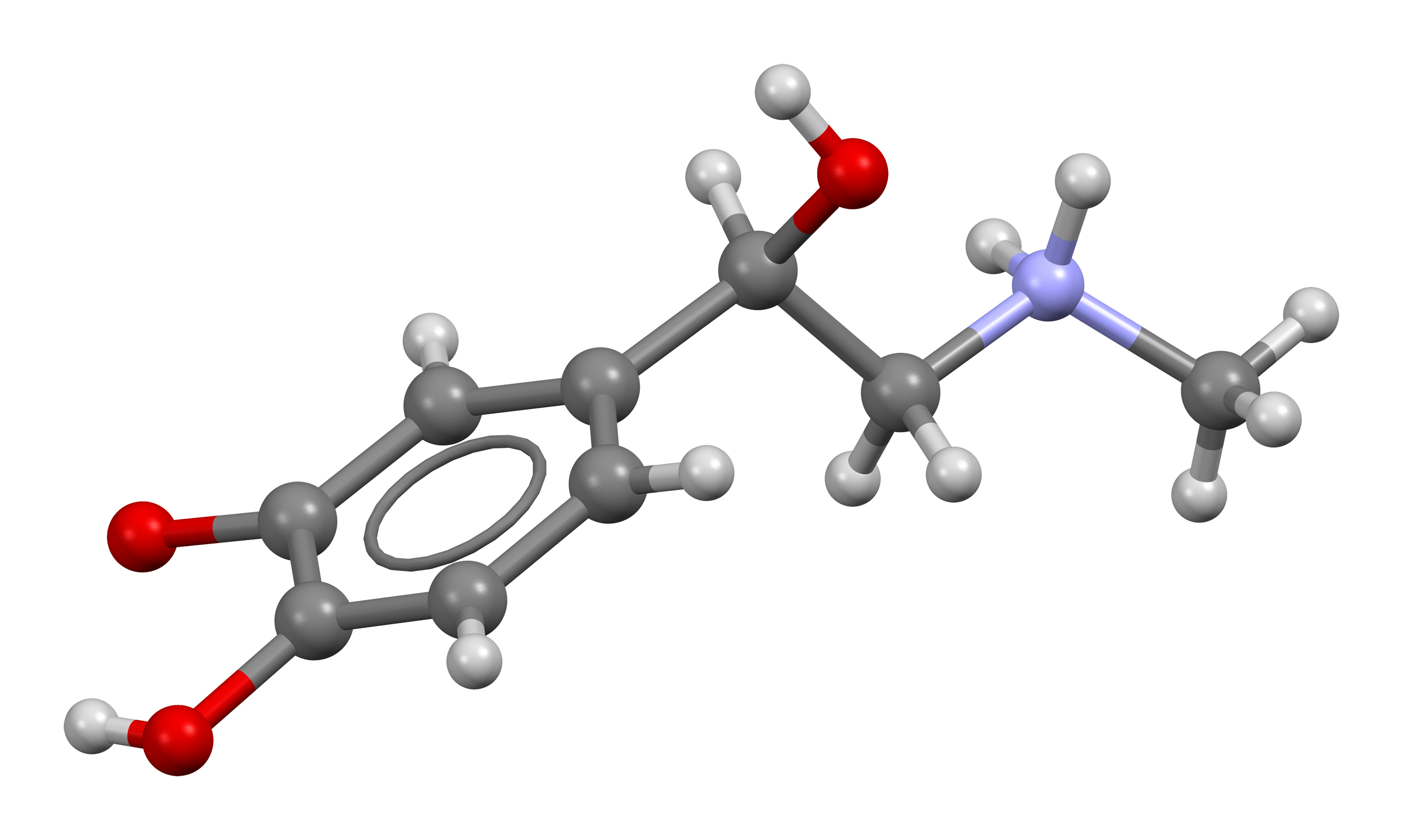
- Ball-and-stick model of the zwitterionic form of adrenaline found in the crystal structure

Clinical data
- Trade names: Epipen, Adrenaclick, others
- Other names: Epinephrine, adrenaline, adrenalin; 3,4,β-Trihydroxy-N-methylphenethylamine
- AHFS/Drugs.com: Monograph
- MedlinePlus: a603002
- License data: US DailyMed: Epinephrine
- Pregnancy category: AU: A
- Routes of administration: Intravenous, intramuscular, endotracheal, intracardiac, intranasal, ophthalmic
- Drug class: Adrenergic receptor agonist; Sympathomimetic
- ATC code: A01AD01 (WHO) B02BC09 (WHO) C01CA24 (WHO) R01AA14 (WHO) R03AA01 (WHO) S01EA01 (WHO)

Physiological data
- Receptors: Adrenergic receptors
- Metabolism: Adrenergic synapse (MAO and COMT)

Legal status
- Legal status: AU: S4 (Prescription only); UK: POM (Prescription only); US: ℞-only; EU: Rx-only

Pharmacokinetic data
- Bioavailability: Oral: negligible; Intravenous: c. 99%; Subcutaneous: high
- Protein binding: 15–20%
- Metabolism: Adrenergic synapse (MAO and COMT)
- Metabolites: Metanephrine
- Onset of action: Rapid
- Elimination half-life: 2–3 minutes in plasma
- Duration of action: Few minutes
- Excretion: Urine

Identifiers
- IUPAC name: (R)-4-(1-Hydroxy-2-(methylamino)ethyl)benzene-1,2-diol
- CAS Number: 51-43-4
- PubChem CID: 5816
- IUPHAR/BPS: 479
- DrugBank: DB00668
- ChemSpider: 5611
- UNII: YKH834O4BH
- KEGG: D00095
- ChEBI: CHEBI:28918
- ChEMBL: ChEMBL679
- PDB ligand: ALE (PDBe, RCSB PDB)
- CompTox Dashboard (EPA): DTXSID5022986
- ECHA InfoCard: 100.000.090

Chemical and physical data
- Formula: C_{9}H_{13}NO_{3}
- Molar mass: 183.207 g·mol^{−1}
- 3D model (JSmol): Interactive image
- Density: 1.283±0.06 g/cm^{3} @ 20 °C, 760 Torr
- SMILES: CNC[C@H](O)c1ccc(O)c(O)c1
- InChI: InChI=1S/C9H13NO3/c1-10-5-9(13)6-2-3-7(11)8(12)4-6/h2-4,9-13H,5H2,1H3/t9-/m0/s1; Key:UCTWMZQNUQWSLP-VIFPVBQESA-N

Adrenaline, also known as epinephrine and alternatively spelled adrenalin, is a hormone and medication which is involved in regulating visceral functions (e.g., respiration). It appears as a white microcrystalline granule. Adrenaline is normally produced by the adrenal glands and by a small number of neurons in the medulla oblongata. It plays an essential role in the fight-or-flight response by increasing blood flow to muscles, heart output by acting on the SA node, pupil dilation response, and blood sugar level. It does this by binding to alpha and beta receptors. It is found in many animals, including humans, and some single-celled organisms. It has also been isolated from the plant Scoparia dulcis found in Northern Vietnam.

== Medical uses ==
As a medication, it is used to treat several conditions, including allergic reaction anaphylaxis, cardiac arrest, and superficial bleeding. Inhaled adrenaline may be used to improve the symptoms of croup. It may also be used for asthma when other treatments are not effective. It is given intravenously, by injection into a muscle, by inhalation, or by injection just under the skin. Common side effects include shakiness, anxiety, and sweating. A fast heart rate and high blood pressure may occur. Occasionally it may result in an abnormal heart rhythm. While the safety of its use during pregnancy and breastfeeding is unclear, the benefits to the mother must be taken into account.

A case has been made for the use of adrenaline infusion in place of the widely accepted treatment of inotropes for preterm infants with clinical cardiovascular compromise. Although sufficient data strongly recommends adrenaline infusions as a viable treatment, more trials are needed to conclusively determine that these infusions will successfully reduce morbidity and mortality rates among preterm, cardiovascularly compromised infants.

Epinephrine can also be used to treat open-angle glaucoma, as it increases the outflow of aqueous humor from the eye, which lowers intraocular pressure.

== Physiological effects ==
The adrenal medulla is a major contributor to total circulating catecholamines (L-DOPA is at a higher concentration in the plasma), though it contributes over 90% of circulating adrenaline. Little adrenaline is found in other tissues, mostly in scattered chromaffin cells and in a small number of neurons that use adrenaline as a neurotransmitter. Following adrenalectomy, adrenaline disappears below the detection limit in the bloodstream.

Pharmacological doses of adrenaline stimulate α_{1}, α_{2}, β_{1}, β_{2}, and β_{3} adrenoceptors of the sympathetic nervous system. Sympathetic nerve receptors are classified as adrenergic, based on their responsiveness to adrenaline. The term "adrenergic" is often misinterpreted in that the main sympathetic neurotransmitter is noradrenaline, rather than adrenaline, as discovered by Ulf von Euler in 1946. Adrenaline has a β_{2} adrenoceptor-mediated effect on metabolism and the airway, with no direct neural connection from the sympathetic ganglia to the airway.

Walter Bradford Cannon originally proposed the concept of the adrenal medulla and the sympathetic nervous system being involved in the flight, fight, and fright response. But the adrenal medulla, in contrast to the adrenal cortex, is not required for survival. In adrenalectomized patients, hemodynamic and metabolic responses to stimuli such as hypoglycemia and exercise remain normal.

=== Exercise ===
One physiological stimulus to adrenaline secretion is exercise. This was first demonstrated by measuring the dilation of a (denervated) pupil of a cat on a treadmill, later confirmed using a biological assay of urine samples. Biochemical methods for measuring catecholamines in plasma were published from 1950 onwards. Although much valuable work has been published using fluorimetric assays to measure total catecholamine concentrations, the method is too non-specific and insensitive to accurately determine the very small quantities of adrenaline in plasma. The development of extraction methods and enzyme–isotope derivate radio-enzymatic assays (REA) transformed the analysis down to a sensitivity of 1 pg for adrenaline. Early REA plasma assays indicated that adrenaline and total catecholamines rise late in exercise, mostly when anaerobic metabolism commences.

During exercise, the adrenaline blood concentration rises partially from the increased secretion of the adrenal medulla and partly from the decreased metabolism of adrenaline due to reduced blood flow to the liver. Infusion of adrenaline to reproduce exercise circulating concentrations of adrenaline in subjects at rest has little hemodynamic effect other than a slight β_{2}-mediated fall in diastolic blood pressure. Infusion of adrenaline well within the physiological range suppresses human airway hyper-reactivity sufficiently to antagonize the constrictor effects of inhaled histamine.

A link between the sympathetic nervous system and the lungs was shown in 1887 when Grossman showed that stimulation of cardiac accelerator nerves reversed muscarine-induced airway constriction. In experiments in the dog, where the sympathetic chain was cut at the level of the diaphragm, Jackson showed that there was no direct sympathetic innervation to the lung, but bronchoconstriction was reversed by the release of adrenaline from the adrenal medulla. An increased incidence of asthma has not been reported for adrenalectomized patients; those with a predisposition to asthma will have some protection from airway hyper-reactivity from their corticosteroid replacement therapy. Exercise induces progressive airway dilation in normal subjects that correlates with workload and is not prevented by beta-blockade. The progressive airway dilation with increasing exercise is mediated by a progressive reduction in resting vagal tone. Beta blockade with propranolol causes a rebound in airway resistance after exercise in normal subjects over the same time course as the bronchoconstriction seen with exercise-induced asthma. The reduction in airway resistance during exercise reduces the work of breathing.

=== Emotional responses ===
Every emotional response has a behavioral, an autonomic, and a hormonal component. The hormonal component includes the release of adrenaline, an adrenomedullary response to stress controlled by the sympathetic nervous system. The major emotion studied in relation to adrenaline is fear. In an experiment, subjects who were injected with adrenaline expressed more negative and fewer positive facial expressions to fear films compared to a control group. These subjects also reported a more intense fear from the films and greater mean intensity of negative memories than control subjects. The findings from this study demonstrate that there are learned associations between negative feelings and levels of adrenaline. Overall, the greater amount of adrenaline is positively correlated with an aroused state of negative emotions. These findings can be an effect in part that adrenaline elicits physiological sympathetic responses, including an increased heart rate and knee shaking, which can be attributed to the feeling of fear regardless of the actual level of fear elicited from the video. Although studies have found a definite relation between adrenaline and fear, other emotions have not had such results. In the same study, subjects did not express a greater amusement to an amusement film nor greater anger to an anger film. Similar findings were also supported in a study that involved rodent subjects that either were able or unable to produce adrenaline. Findings support the idea that adrenaline has a role in facilitating the encoding of emotionally arousing events, contributing to higher levels of arousal due to fear.

=== Memory ===
It has been found that adrenergic hormones, such as adrenaline, can produce retrograde enhancement of long-term memory in humans. The release of adrenaline due to emotionally stressful events, which is endogenous adrenaline, can modulate memory consolidation of the events, ensuring memory strength that is proportional to memory importance. Post-learning adrenaline activity also interacts with the degree of arousal associated with the initial coding. There is evidence that suggests adrenaline does have a role in long-term stress adaptation and emotional memory encoding specifically. Adrenaline may also play a role in elevating arousal and fear memory under particular pathological conditions, including post-traumatic stress disorder. Overall, "Extensive evidence indicates that epinephrine (EPI) modulates memory consolidation for emotionally arousing tasks in animals and human subjects." Studies have also found that recognition memory involving adrenaline depends on a mechanism that depends on β adrenoceptors. Adrenaline does not readily cross the blood-brain barrier, so its effects on memory consolidation are at least partly initiated by β adrenoceptors in the periphery. Studies have found that sotalol, a β adrenoceptor antagonist that also does not readily enter the brain, blocks the enhancing effects of peripherally administered adrenaline on memory. These findings suggest that β adrenoceptors are necessary for adrenaline to have an impact on memory consolidation.

== Pathology ==
Increased adrenaline secretion is observed in pheochromocytoma, hypoglycemia, myocardial infarction, and to a lesser degree, in essential tremor (also known as benign, familial, or idiopathic tremor). A general increase in sympathetic neural activity is usually accompanied by increased adrenaline secretion, but there is selectivity during hypoxia and hypoglycemia, when the ratio of adrenaline to noradrenaline is considerably increased. Therefore, there must be some autonomy of the adrenal medulla from the rest of the sympathetic system.

Myocardial infarction is associated with high levels of circulating adrenaline and noradrenaline, particularly in cardiogenic shock.

Benign familial tremor (essential tremor) (BFT) is responsive to peripheral β adrenergic blockers, and β_{2}-stimulation is known to cause tremor. Patients with BFT were found to have increased plasma adrenaline but not noradrenaline.

Low or absent concentrations of adrenaline can be seen in autonomic neuropathy or following adrenalectomy. Failure of the adrenal cortex, as with Addison's disease, can suppress adrenaline secretion as the activity of the synthesizing enzyme, phenylethanolamine-N-methyltransferase, depends on the high concentration of cortisol that drains from the cortex to the medulla.

== Terminology ==
In 1901, Jōkichi Takamine patented a purified extract from the adrenal glands, which was trademarked by Parke, Davis & Co in the US. The British Approved Name and European Pharmacopoeia term for this drug is hence adrenaline (from Latin ad, "on", and rēnālis, "of the kidney", from ren, "kidney").

However, the pharmacologist John Abel had already prepared an extract from adrenal glands as early as 1897, and he coined the name epinephrine to describe it (from Ancient Greek ἐπῐ́ (epí), "upon", and νεφρός (nephrós), "kidney"). As the term Adrenaline was a registered trademark in the US, and in the belief that Abel's extract was the same as Takamine's (a belief since disputed), epinephrine instead became the generic name used in the US and remains the pharmaceutical's United States Adopted Name and International Nonproprietary Name (though the name adrenaline is frequently used).

The terminology is now one of the few differences between the INN and BAN systems of names. Although European health professionals and scientists preferentially use the term adrenaline, the converse is true among American health professionals and scientists. Nevertheless, even among the latter, receptors for this substance are called adrenergic receptors or adrenoceptors, and pharmaceuticals that mimic its effects are often called adrenergics. The history of adrenaline and epinephrine is reviewed by Rao.

== Mechanism of action ==
Physiologic responses to adrenaline by organ
Organ	Effects
Heart	Increases heart rate; contractility; conduction across AV node
Lungs	Increases respiratory rate; bronchodilation
Liver	Stimulates glycogenolysis
Muscle	Stimulates glycogenolysis and glycolysis
Brain	Increased cerebral tissue oxygenation
Systemic	Vasoconstriction and vasodilation
Systemic	Triggers lipolysis
Systemic	Muscle contraction

7x speed timelapse video of fish melanophores responding to 200μM adrenaline

As a hormone, adrenaline acts on nearly all body tissues by binding to adrenergic receptors. Its effects on various tissues depend on the type of tissue and expression of specific forms of adrenergic receptors. For example, high levels of adrenaline cause smooth muscle relaxation in the airways but causes contraction of the smooth muscle that lines most arterioles.

Adrenaline is a nonselective agonist of all adrenergic receptors, including the major subtypes α_{1}, α_{2}, β_{1}, β_{2}, and β_{3}. Adrenaline's binding to these receptors triggers a number of metabolic changes. Binding to α-adrenergic receptors inhibits insulin secretion by the pancreas, stimulates glycogenolysis in the liver and muscle, and stimulates glycolysis and inhibits insulin-mediated glycogenesis in muscle. β adrenergic receptor binding triggers glucagon secretion in the pancreas, increased adrenocorticotropic hormone (ACTH) secretion by the pituitary gland, and increased lipolysis by adipose tissue. Together, these effects increase blood glucose and fatty acids, providing substrates for energy production within cells throughout the body. Binding of β adrenergic receptor also increases the production of cyclic AMP.

Adrenaline causes liver cells to release glucose into the blood, acting through both alpha and beta-adrenergic receptors to stimulate glycogenolysis. Adrenaline binds to β_{2} receptors on liver cells, which changes conformation and helps G_{s}, a heterotrimeric G protein, exchange GDP to GTP. This trimeric G protein dissociates to G_{s} alpha and G_{s} beta/gamma subunits. G_{s} alpha stimulates adenylyl cyclase, thus converting adenosine triphosphate into cyclic adenosine monophosphate (AMP). Cyclic AMP activates protein kinase A. Protein kinase A phosphorylates and partially activates phosphorylase kinase. Adrenaline also binds to α_{1} adrenergic receptors, causing an increase in inositol trisphosphate, inducing calcium ions to enter the cytoplasm. Calcium ions bind to calmodulin, which leads to further activation of phosphorylase kinase. Phosphorylase kinase phosphorylates glycogen phosphorylase, which then breaks down glycogen leading to the production of glucose.

Adrenaline also has significant effects on the cardiovascular system. It increases peripheral resistance via α_{1} receptor-dependent vasoconstriction and increases cardiac output by binding to β_{1} receptors. The goal of reducing peripheral circulation is to increase coronary and cerebral perfusion pressures and therefore increase oxygen exchange at the cellular level. While adrenaline does increase aortic, cerebral, and carotid circulation pressure, it lowers carotid blood flow and end-tidal CO_{2} or E_{T}CO_{2} levels. It appears that adrenaline improves microcirculation at the expense of the capillary beds where perfusion takes place.

== Measurement in biological fluids ==
Adrenaline may be quantified in blood, plasma, or serum as a diagnostic aid, to monitor therapeutic administration, or to identify the causative agent in a potential poisoning victim. Endogenous plasma adrenaline concentrations in resting adults usually are less than 10 ng/L, but they may increase by 10-fold during exercise and by 50-fold or more during times of stress. Pheochromocytoma patients often have plasma adrenaline levels of 1000–10,000 ng/L. Parenteral administration of adrenaline to acute-care cardiac patients can produce plasma concentrations of 10,000 to 100,000 ng/L.

== Biosynthesis ==
The biosynthesis of adrenaline involves a series of enzymatic reactions.

In chemical terms, adrenaline is one of a group of monoamines called the catecholamines. Adrenaline is synthesized in the chromaffin cells of the adrenal gland's adrenal medulla and a small number of neurons in the medulla oblongata in the brain through a metabolic pathway that converts the amino acids phenylalanine and tyrosine into a series of metabolic intermediates and, ultimately, adrenaline. Tyrosine is first oxidized to L-DOPA by tyrosine hydroxylase; this is the rate-limiting step. Then it is subsequently decarboxylated to give dopamine by DOPA decarboxylase (aromatic L-amino acid decarboxylase). Dopamine is then converted to noradrenaline by dopamine beta-hydroxylase, which utilizes ascorbic acid (vitamin C) and copper. The final step in adrenaline biosynthesis is the methylation of the primary amine of noradrenaline. This reaction is catalyzed by the enzyme phenylethanolamine N-methyltransferase (PNMT), which utilizes S-adenosyl methionine (SAMe) as the methyl donor. While PNMT is found primarily in the cytosol of the endocrine cells of the adrenal medulla (also known as chromaffin cells), it has been detected at low levels in both the heart and brain.

Biosynthetic pathways for catecholamines and trace amines in the human brain
Epinephrine is produced in a small group of neurons in the human brain (specifically, in the medulla oblongata) via the metabolic pathway shown above.

=== Regulation ===
The major physiologic triggers of adrenaline release center upon stresses, such as physical threat, excitement, noise, bright lights, and high or low ambient temperature. All of these stimuli are processed in the central nervous system.

Adrenocorticotropic hormone (ACTH) and the sympathetic nervous system stimulate the synthesis of adrenaline precursors by enhancing the activity of tyrosine hydroxylase and dopamine β-hydroxylase, two key enzymes involved in catecholamine synthesis. ACTH also stimulates the adrenal cortex to release cortisol, which increases the expression of PNMT in chromaffin cells, enhancing adrenaline synthesis. This is most often done in response to stress. The sympathetic nervous system, acting via splanchnic nerves to the adrenal medulla, stimulates the release of adrenaline. Acetylcholine released by preganglionic sympathetic fibers of these nerves acts on nicotinic acetylcholine receptors, causing cell depolarization and an influx of calcium through voltage-gated calcium channels. Calcium triggers the exocytosis of chromaffin granules and, thus, the release of adrenaline (and noradrenaline) into the bloodstream. For noradrenaline to be acted upon by PNMT in the cytosol, it must first be shipped out of granules of the chromaffin cells. This may occur via the catecholamine-H^{+} exchanger VMAT1. VMAT1 is also responsible for transporting newly synthesized adrenaline from the cytosol back into chromaffin granules in preparation for release.

Unlike many other hormones, adrenaline (as with other catecholamines) does not exert negative feedback to down-regulate its own synthesis. Abnormal adrenaline levels can occur in various conditions, such as surreptitious adrenaline administration, pheochromocytoma, and other tumors of the sympathetic ganglia.

Its action is terminated with reuptake into nerve terminal endings, some minute dilution, and metabolism by monoamine oxidase and catechol-O-methyl transferase into 3,4-Dihydroxymandelic acid and Metanephrine.

== Chemistry ==
Adrenaline, also known as 3,4,β-trihydroxy-N-methylphenethylamine, is a substituted phenethylamine and catecholamine. It is the N-methylated analogue of norepinephrine (noradrenaline; 3,4,β-trihydroxyphenethylamine) and the N-methylated and β-hydroxylated analogue of dopamine (3,4-dihydroxyphenethylamine). Its chemical composition is Nonacarbon Tridecahydrogen Nitrogen Trioxygen (C_{9}H_{13}NO_{3}).

== History ==
Extracts of the adrenal gland were first obtained by Polish physiologist Napoleon Cybulski in 1895. These extracts, which he called nadnerczyna ("adrenalin"), contained adrenaline and other catecholamines. American ophthalmologist William H. Bates discovered adrenaline's usage for eye surgeries prior to 20 April 1896. In 1897, John Jacob Abel (1857–1938), the father of modern pharmacology, found a natural substance produced by the adrenal glands that he named epinephrine. The first hormone to be identified, it remains a crucial, first-line treatment for cardiac arrests, severe allergic reactions, and other conditions. In 1901, Jokichi Takamine successfully isolated and purified the hormone from the adrenal glands of sheep and oxen. Adrenaline was first synthesized in the laboratory by Friedrich Stolz and Henry Drysdale Dakin, independently, in 1904.

Although secretin is mentioned as the first hormone, adrenaline is the first hormone since the discovery of the activity of adrenal extract on blood pressure was observed in 1895 before that of secretin in 1902. In 1895, George Oliver (1841–1915), a general practitioner in North Yorkshire, and Edward Albert Schäfer (1850–1935), a physiologist at University College of London published a paper about the active component of adrenal gland extract causing the increase in blood pressure and heart rate was from the medulla, but not the cortex of the adrenal gland. In 1897, John Jacob Abel (1857–1938) of Johns Hopkins University, the first chairman of the first US department of pharmacology, found a compound called epinephrine with the molecular formula of C_{17}H_{15}NO_{4}. Abel claimed his principle from adrenal gland extract was active.

In 1900, Jōkichi Takamine (1854–1922), a Japanese chemist, worked with his assistant, Keizo Uenaka (1876–1960), to purify a 2000 times more active principle than epinephrine from the adrenal gland, named adrenaline with the molecular formula C_{10}H_{15}NO_{3}. Additionally, in 1900 Thomas Aldrich of Parke-Davis Scientific Laboratory also purified adrenaline independently. Takamine and Parke-Davis later in 1901 both got the patent for adrenaline. The fight for terminology between adrenaline and epinephrine was not ended until the first adrenaline structural discovery by Hermann Pauly (1870–1950) in 1903 and the first adrenaline synthesis by Friedrich Stolz (1860–1936), a German chemist in 1904. Stolz synthesized adrenaline from its ketone form (adrenalone).

== Society and culture ==
=== Adrenaline junkie ===
An adrenaline junkie is someone who "has a compulsive desire for extreme excitement". Such activities include extreme and risky sports, substance abuse, unsafe sex, and crime. The term relates to the increase in circulating levels of adrenaline during physiological stress. Such an increase in the circulating concentration of adrenaline is secondary to the activation of the sympathetic nerves innervating the adrenal medulla, as it is rapid and not present in animals where the adrenal gland has been removed. Although such stress triggers adrenaline release, it also activates many other responses within the central nervous system reward system, which drives behavioral responses; while the circulating adrenaline concentration is present, it may not drive behavior. Nevertheless, adrenaline infusion alone does increase alertness and has roles in the brain, including the augmentation of memory consolidation.

=== Strength ===
Adrenaline has been implicated in feats of great strength, often occurring in times of crisis. For example, there are stories of a parent lifting part of a car when their child is trapped underneath, showcasing the ability of the body to endure under stress and highlighting the significant effects of adrenaline in unlocking extraordinary physical abilities.
