= Catecholamine =

Class of chemical compounds

Catecholamines

Epinephrine (adrenaline)

Norepinephrine (noradrenaline)

Dopamine

Catechol

A catecholamine (/ˌkætəˈkoʊləmiːn/; abbreviated CA), most typically a 3,4-dihydroxyphenethylamine, is a monoamine neurotransmitter, an organic compound that has a catechol (benzene with two hydroxyl side groups next to each other) and a side-chain amine.

Catechol can be either a free molecule or a substituent of a larger molecule, where it represents a 1,2-dihydroxybenzene group.

Catecholamines are derived from the amino acid tyrosine, which is derived from dietary sources as well as synthesis from phenylalanine. Catecholamines are water-soluble and are 50% bound to plasma proteins in circulation.

Included among catecholamines are epinephrine (adrenaline), norepinephrine (noradrenaline), and dopamine. Release of the hormones epinephrine and norepinephrine from the adrenal medulla of the adrenal glands is part of the fight-or-flight response.

Tyrosine is created from phenylalanine by hydroxylation by the enzyme phenylalanine hydroxylase. Tyrosine is also ingested directly from dietary protein. Catecholamine-secreting cells use several reactions to convert tyrosine serially to L-DOPA and then to dopamine. Depending on the cell type, dopamine may be further converted to norepinephrine or even further converted to epinephrine.

Various stimulant drugs (such as a number of substituted amphetamines) are catecholamine analogues.

== Structure ==
Catecholamines have the distinct structure of a benzene ring with two hydroxyl groups, an intermediate ethyl chain, and a terminal amine group. Phenylethanolamines such as norepinephrine have a hydroxyl group on the ethyl chain.

== Production and degradation ==
Biosynthetic pathways for catecholamines and trace amines in the human brain
In humans, catecholamines (shown in yellow) are derived from the amino acid L-phenylalanine.
L-Phenylalanine is converted into L-tyrosine by an aromatic amino acid hydroxylase (AAAH) enzyme (phenylalanine 4-hydroxylase), with molecular oxygen (O_{2}) and tetrahydrobiopterin as cofactors. L-Tyrosine is converted into L-DOPA by another AAAH enzyme (tyrosine 3-hydroxylase) with tetrahydrobiopterin, O_{2}, and ferrous iron (Fe^{2+}) as cofactors. L-DOPA is converted into dopamine by the enzyme aromatic L-amino acid decarboxylase (AADC), with pyridoxal phosphate as the cofactor. Dopamine itself is also used as precursor in the synthesis of the neurotransmitters norepinephrine and epinephrine. Dopamine is converted into norepinephrine by the enzyme dopamine β-hydroxylase (DBH), with O_{2} and L-ascorbic acid as cofactors. Norepinephrine is converted into epinephrine by the enzyme phenylethanolamine N-methyltransferase (PNMT) with S-adenosyl-L-methionine as the cofactor.

=== Location ===
Catecholamines are produced mainly by the chromaffin cells of the adrenal medulla and the postganglionic fibers of the sympathetic nervous system. Dopamine, which acts as a neurotransmitter in the central nervous system, is largely produced in neuronal cell bodies in two areas of the brainstem: the ventral tegmental area and the substantia nigra, the latter of which contains neuromelanin-pigmented neurons. The similarly neuromelanin-pigmented cell bodies of the locus coeruleus produce norepinephrine. Epinephrine is produced in small groups of neurons in the human brain which express its synthesizing enzyme, phenylethanolamine N-methyltransferase; these neurons project from a nucleus that is adjacent (ventrolateral) to the area postrema and from a nucleus in the dorsal region of the solitary tract.

=== Biosynthesis ===
Dopamine is the first catecholamine synthesized from DOPA. In turn, norepinephrine and epinephrine are derived from further metabolic modification of dopamine. The enzyme dopamine hydroxylase requires copper as a cofactor (not shown in the diagram) and DOPA decarboxylase requires PLP (not shown in the diagram). The rate limiting step in catecholamine biosynthesis through the predominant metabolic pathway is the hydroxylation of L-tyrosine to L-DOPA.

Catecholamine synthesis is inhibited by alpha-methyl-p-tyrosine (AMPT), which inhibits tyrosine hydroxylase.

The amino acids phenylalanine and tyrosine are precursors for catecholamines. Both amino acids are found in high concentrations in blood plasma and the brain. In mammals, tyrosine can be formed from dietary phenylalanine by the enzyme phenylalanine hydroxylase, found in large amounts in the liver. Insufficient amounts of phenylalanine hydroxylase result in phenylketonuria, a metabolic disorder that leads to intellectual deficits unless treated by dietary manipulation. Catecholamine synthesis is usually considered to begin with tyrosine. The enzyme tyrosine hydroxylase (TH) converts the amino acid L-tyrosine into 3,4-dihydroxyphenylalanine (L-DOPA). The hydroxylation of L-tyrosine by TH results in the formation of the DA precursor L-DOPA, which is metabolized by aromatic L-amino acid decarboxylase (AADC; see Cooper et al., 2002) to the transmitter dopamine. This step occurs so rapidly that it is difficult to measure L-DOPA in the brain without first inhibiting AADC. In neurons that use DA as the transmitter, the decarboxylation of L-DOPA to dopamine is the final step in formation of the transmitter; however, in those neurons using norepinephrine (noradrenaline) or epinephrine (adrenaline) as transmitters, the enzyme dopamine β-hydroxylase (DBH), which converts dopamine to yield norepinephrine, is also present. In still other neurons in which epinephrine is the transmitter, a third enzyme phenylethanolamine N-methyltransferase (PNMT) converts norepinephrine into epinephrine. Thus, a cell that uses epinephrine as its transmitter contains four enzymes (TH, AADC, DBH, and PNMT), whereas norepinephrine neurons contain only three enzymes (lacking PNMT) and dopamine cells only two (TH and AADC).

=== Degradation ===
Catecholamines have a half-life of a few minutes when circulating in the blood. They can be degraded either by methylation by catechol-O-methyltransferases (COMT) or by deamination by monoamine oxidases (MAO).

MAOIs bind to MAO, thereby preventing it from breaking down catecholamines and other monoamines.

Catabolism of catecholamines is mediated by two main enzymes: catechol-O-methyltransferase (COMT) which is present in the synaptic cleft and cytosol of the cell and monoamine oxidase (MAO) which is located in the mitochondrial membrane. Both enzymes require cofactors: COMT uses Mg^{2+} as a cofactor while MAO uses FAD. The first step of the catabolic process is mediated by either MAO or COMT which depends on the tissue and location of catecholamines (for example degradation of catecholamines in the synaptic cleft is mediated by COMT because MAO is a mitochondrial enzyme). The next catabolic steps in the pathway involve alcohol dehydrogenase, aldehyde dehydrogenase and aldehyde reductase. The end product of epinephrine and norepinephrine is vanillylmandelic acid (VMA) which is excreted in the urine. Dopamine catabolism leads to the production of homovanillic acid (HVA).

== Function ==
=== Modality ===
Two catecholamines, norepinephrine and dopamine, act as neuromodulators in the central nervous system and as hormones in the blood circulation. The catecholamine norepinephrine is a neuromodulator of the peripheral sympathetic nervous system but is also present in the blood (mostly through "spillover" from the synapses of the sympathetic system).

High catecholamine levels in blood are associated with stress, which can be induced from psychological reactions or environmental stressors such as elevated sound levels, intense light, or low blood sugar levels.

Extremely high levels of catecholamines (also known as catecholamine toxicity) can occur in central nervous system trauma due to stimulation or damage of nuclei in the brainstem, in particular, those nuclei affecting the sympathetic nervous system. In emergency medicine, this occurrence is widely known as a "catecholamine dump".

Extremely high levels of catecholamine can also be caused by neuroendocrine tumors in the adrenal medulla, a treatable condition known as pheochromocytoma.

High levels of catecholamines can also be caused by monoamine oxidase A (MAO-A) deficiency, known as Brunner syndrome. As MAO-A is one of the enzymes responsible for degradation of these neurotransmitters, its deficiency increases the bioavailability of these neurotransmitters considerably. It occurs in the absence of pheochromocytoma, neuroendocrine tumors, and carcinoid syndrome, but it looks similar to carcinoid syndrome with symptoms such as facial flushing and aggression.

Acute porphyria can cause elevated catecholamines.

== Aging ==
Degeneration of the locus coeruleus and reduced production of norepinephrine during aging are under preliminary research as possible factors in the pathogenesis of Alzheimer's disease.

== Physiological effects ==
Catecholamines cause general physiological changes that prepare the body for physical activity (the fight-or-flight response). Some typical effects are increases in heart rate, blood pressure, blood glucose levels, and a general reaction of the sympathetic nervous system. Some drugs, like tolcapone (a central COMT-inhibitor), raise the levels of all the catecholamines. Increased catecholamines may also cause an increased respiratory rate (tachypnoea) in patients.

Catecholamine is secreted into urine after being broken down, and its secretion level can be measured for the diagnosis of illnesses associated with catecholamine levels in the body. Urine testing for catecholamine is used to detect pheochromocytoma.

=== Function in plants ===
They have been found in 44 plant families, but no essential metabolic function has been established for them. They are precursors of benzo[c]phenanthridine alkaloids, which are the active principal ingredients of many medicinal plant extracts. CAs have been implicated to have a possible protective role against insect predators, injuries, and nitrogen detoxification. They have been shown to promote plant tissue growth, somatic embryogenesis from in vitro cultures, and flowering. CAs inhibit indole-3-acetic acid oxidation and enhance ethylene biosynthesis. They have also been shown to enhance synergistically various effects of gibberellins.

== Testing for catecholamines ==
Catecholamines are secreted by cells in tissues of different systems of the human body, mostly by the nervous and the endocrine systems. The adrenal glands secrete certain catecholamines into the blood when the person perceives a threat and prepares for a fight-or-flight response. However, acute or chronic excess of circulating catecholamines can potentially increase blood pressure and heart rate to very high levels and eventually provoke dangerous effects. Tests for fractionated plasma free metanephrines or the urine metanephrines are used to confirm or exclude certain diseases when the doctor identifies signs of hypertension and tachycardia that don't adequately respond to treatment. Each of the tests measure the amount of adrenaline and noradrenaline metabolites, respectively called metanephrine and normetanephrine.

Blood tests are also done to analyze the amount of catecholamines present in the body.

Catecholamine tests are done to identify rare tumors at the adrenal gland or in the nervous system. Catecholamine tests provide information relative to tumors such as: pheochromocytoma, paraganglioma, and neuroblastoma.

== See also ==
- Catechol-O-methyltransferase
- Catecholaminergic polymorphic ventricular tachycardia
- History of catecholamine research
- Hormone
- Julius Axelrod
- Peptide hormone
- Phenethylamine
- Steroid hormone
- Sympathomimetic drug
- Vanillylmandelic acid
