= Pacak–Zhuang syndrome =

Medical condition

The Pacak-Zhuang syndrome is a recently described disease manifestation in females that includes multiple paragangliomas or pheochromocytomas and somatostatinomas (in some), both neuroendocrine tumors, and secondary polycythemia associated with high erythropoietin levels. Paragangliomas in these patients are mainly localized to the abdomen whereas somatostatinomas are found in the second portion of the duodenum, as shown by imaging or biochemistry. This syndrome is of special interest as finding more than one type of neuroendocrine tumor in one individual is unusual. Such co-occurrences are usually seen in patients carrying hereditary syndromes like multiple endocrine neoplasia (MEN), neurofibromatosis 1 (NF1), or von Hippel-Lindau (VHL) disease.

== Genetic pathway ==
Mutations in the genes encoding alpha subunits of hypoxia-inducible factors (HIF-alpha) have not previously been identified in any cancer.

In the Pacak–Zhuang syndrome, patients have somatic gain of function mutations in the genes encoding for HIF2A, leading to prolonged HIF-2α activity and, thus, an increase in its half-life. While each patient has different nucleic acid changes, all patients are found to have a point mutation near the prolyl-sensing residue site, responsible for HIF-2α hydroxylation.

== Diagnosis ==
=== Polycythemia ===
Patients with this syndrome usually have early onset of secondary polycythemia, most of them at birth. They are diagnosed with typical physical characteristics (red cheeks, flushing, swelling of the extremities), which are then confirmed through lab results that show abnormally increased erythropoietin levels.

=== Tumors ===
Patients are initially suspicious for paragangliomas when they present with symptoms like hypertension, heart palpitations, headaches, and anxiety; somatostatinomas usually induce diabetes and cholecystitis. From these symptoms, patients undergo biochemical testing from blood and urine samples as well as functional and anatomical imaging to confirm tumor presence.

=== Other findings ===
Some patients with this syndrome have also been found to have ocular abnormalities, including bilateral fibrosis upon the optic disc and dilated capillaries.

== Treatment ==
The most common therapies for secondary polycythemia are phlebotomies and, for paraganglioma and/or somatostatinoma in this cohort of patients, surgery accompanied by antihypertensive medication. HIF-2α inhibitor belzutifan led to substantial improvement of symptoms in a patient with Pacak–Zhuang syndrome.

== Research direction ==
Researchers are presently seeking to better characterize the syndrome. Currently, this syndrome is known to only manifest in females.
