= Metanephrine =

Names
- IUPAC name 4-(1-hydroxy-2-methylamino-ethyl)-2-methoxy-phenol

Identifiers
CAS Number	5001-33-2
3D model (JSmol)	Interactive image
ChEMBL	ChEMBL775
ChemSpider	19844
IUPHAR/BPS	6644
MeSH	Metanephrine
PubChem CID	21100
UNII	1ZE0530JEJ
CompTox Dashboard (EPA)	DTXSID80863478
- InChI: InChI=1S/C10H15NO3/c1-11-6-9(13)7-3-4-8(12)10(5-7)14-2/h3-5,9,11-13H,6H2,1-2H3 Key: JWJCTZKFYGDABJ-UHFFFAOYSA-N; InChI=1/C10H15NO3/c1-11-6-9(13)7-3-4-8(12)10(5-7)14-2/h3-5,9,11-13H,6H2,1-2H3 Key: JWJCTZKFYGDABJ-UHFFFAOYAB
- SMILES: Oc1ccc(cc1OC)C(O)CNC

Properties
Chemical formula	C_{10}H_{15}NO_{3}
Molar mass	197.231 g/mol
- Except where otherwise noted, data are given for materials in their standard state (at 25 °C [77 °F], 100 kPa). verify (what is ?) Infobox references

Metanephrine, also known as metadrenaline, is a metabolite of epinephrine (also known as adrenaline) created by action of catechol-O-methyl transferase on epinephrine. An article in the Journal of the American Medical Association, 2002, indicated that the measurement of plasma free levels of the metanephrines group of molecules (including metanephrine and normetanephrine) is the best tool in the diagnosis of pheochromocytoma, an adrenal medullary neoplasm.

epinephrine
