= Normetanephrine =

Names
- IUPAC name 4-(2-amino-1-hydroxy-ethyl)- 2-methoxy-phenol

Identifiers
CAS Number	97-31-4
3D model (JSmol)	Interactive image
ChEMBL	ChEMBL774
ChemSpider	1200
IUPHAR/BPS	6643
MeSH	Normetanephrine
PubChem CID	1237
UNII	0J45DE6B88
CompTox Dashboard (EPA)	DTXSID70861701
- InChI: InChI=1S/C9H13NO3/c1-13-9-4-6(8(12)5-10)2-3-7(9)11/h2-4,8,11-12H,5,10H2,1H3 Key: YNYAYWLBAHXHLL-UHFFFAOYSA-N; InChI=1/C9H13NO3/c1-13-9-4-6(8(12)5-10)2-3-7(9)11/h2-4,8,11-12H,5,10H2,1H3 Key: YNYAYWLBAHXHLL-UHFFFAOYAR
- SMILES: Oc1ccc(cc1OC)C(O)CN

Properties
Chemical formula	C_{9}H_{13}NO_{3}
Molar mass	183.204 g/mol
- Except where otherwise noted, data are given for materials in their standard state (at 25 °C [77 °F], 100 kPa). verify (what is ?) Infobox references

Normetanephrine, also called normetadrenaline, is a metabolite of norepinephrine created by action of catechol-O-methyl transferase on norepinephrine. It is excreted in the urine and found in certain tissues. It is a marker for catecholamine-secreting tumors such as pheochromocytoma.

Norepinephrine degradation. Normetanephrine is shown at top left. Enzymes are shown in boxes.
