= Control of ventilation =

Breathing control

The control of ventilation in higher vertebrates is the physiological process, and the set of related mechanisms, involved in the control of breathing, which is the movement of air into and out of the lungs. Ventilation facilitates respiration. Term respiration refers to the utilization of oxygen and balancing of carbon dioxide by the body as a whole, or by individual cells (in the case of cellular respiration).

The most important function of breathing is the supplying of oxygen to the body and balancing of the carbon dioxide levels. Under most conditions, the partial pressure of carbon dioxide (pCO_{2}), or concentration of carbon dioxide in the bloodstream, controls the respiratory rate.

The peripheral chemoreceptors that detect changes in the levels of oxygen and carbon dioxide are located in the arterial aortic bodies and the carotid bodies. Central chemoreceptors are primarily sensitive to changes in the pH of the blood, (resulting from changes in the levels of carbon dioxide) and they are located on the medulla oblongata near to the medullary respiratory groups of the respiratory center. Information from the peripheral chemoreceptors is conveyed along nerves to the respiratory groups of the respiratory center. There are four respiratory groups, two in the medulla and two in the pons. The two groups in the pons are known as the pontine respiratory group.

1. Dorsal respiratory group – in the medulla
2. Ventral respiratory group – in the medulla
3. Pneumotaxic center – various nuclei of the pons
4. Apneustic center – nucleus of the pons

From the respiratory center, the muscles of respiration, in particular the diaphragm, are activated to cause air to move in and out of the lungs.

== Control of respiratory rhythm ==
=== Ventilatory pattern ===
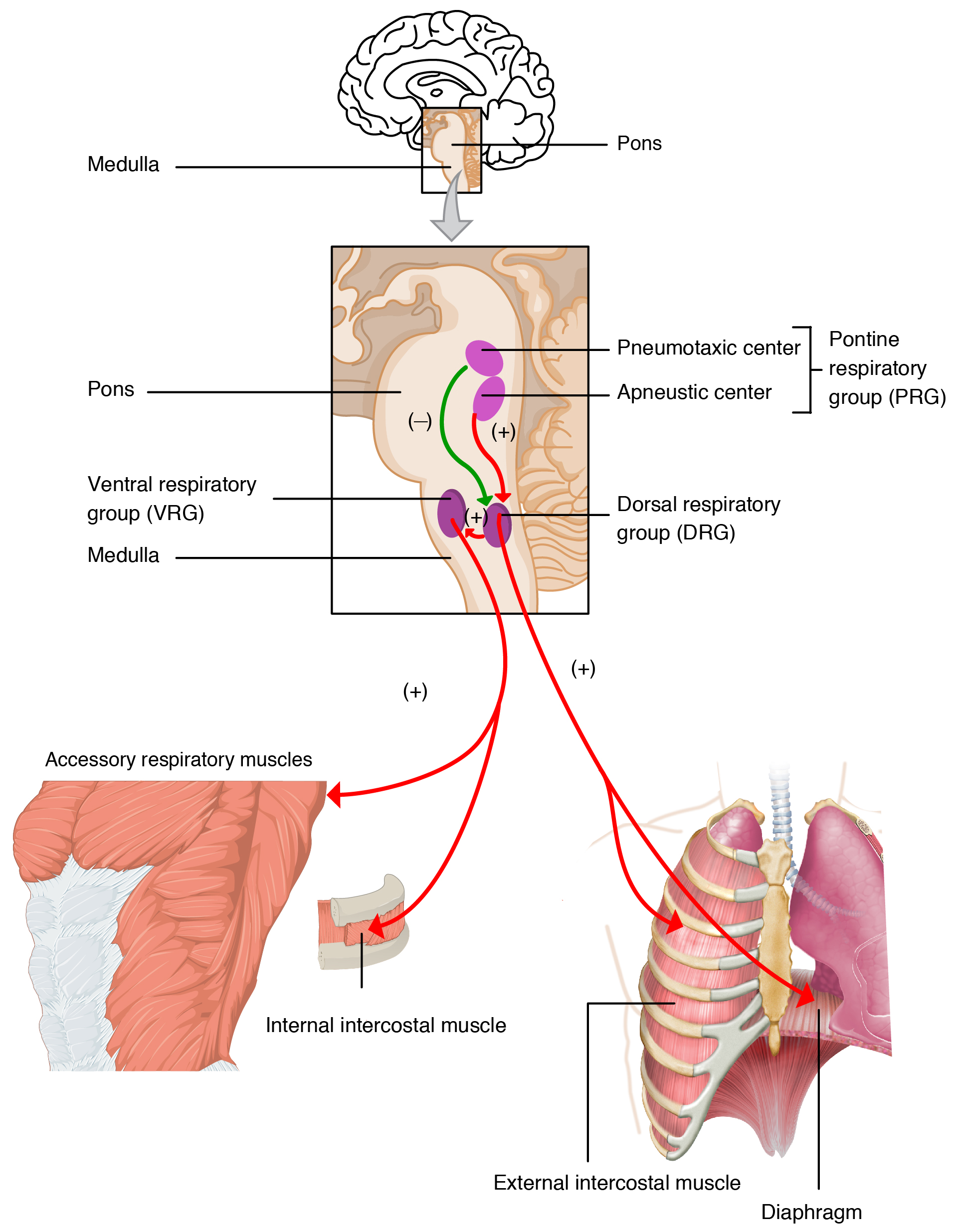
Respiratory centre and its groups of neurons

Breathing is normally an unconscious, involuntary, automatic process. The pattern of motor stimuli during breathing can be divided into an inhalation stage and an exhalation stage. Inhalation shows a sudden, ramped increase in motor discharge to the respiratory muscles (and the pharyngeal constrictor muscles). Before the end of inhalation, there is a decline in, and end of motor discharge. Exhalation is usually silent, except at high respiratory rates.

The respiratory center in the medulla and pons of the brainstem controls the rate and depth of respiration, (the respiratory rhythm), through various inputs. These include signals from the peripheral chemoreceptors and central chemoreceptors; from the vagus nerve and glossopharyngeal nerve carrying input from the pulmonary stretch receptors, and other mechanoreceptors in the lungs. as well as signals from the cerebral cortex and hypothalamus.

- Medulla
  - ventral respiratory group (includes the pre-Bötzinger complex). The ventral respiratory group controls voluntary forced exhalation and acts to increase the force of inhalation. Regulates rhythm of inhalation and exhalation.
  - dorsal respiratory group (solitary nucleus). The dorsal respiratory group controls mostly movements of inhalation and their timing.
- Pons
  - pneumotaxic center.
    - Coordinates speed of inhalation and exhalation
    - Sends inhibitory impulses to the inspiratory area
    - Involved in fine tuning of respiration rate.
  - apneustic center
    - Coordinates speed of inhalation and exhalation.
    - Sends stimulatory impulses to the inspiratory area – activates and prolongs inhalations
    - Overridden by pneumotaxic control from the apneustic area to end inhalation

=== Control of ventilatory pattern ===
Ventilation is normally unconscious and automatic, but can be overridden by conscious alternative patterns. Thus the emotions can cause yawning, laughing, sighing (etc.), social communication causes speech, song and whistling, while entirely voluntary overrides are used to blow out candles, and breath holding (for instance, to swim underwater). Hyperventilation may be entirely voluntary or in response to emotional agitation or anxiety, when it can cause the distressing hyperventilation syndrome. The voluntary control can also influence other functions such as the heart rate as in yoga practices and meditation.

The ventilatory pattern is also temporarily modified by complex reflexes such as sneezing, straining, burping, coughing and vomiting.

=== Determinants of ventilatory rate ===
Ventilatory rate (respiratory minute volume) is tightly controlled and determined primarily by blood levels of carbon dioxide as determined by metabolic rate. Blood levels of oxygen become important in hypoxia. These levels are sensed by central chemoreceptors on the surface of the medulla oblongata for decreased pH (indirectly from the increase of carbon dioxide in cerebrospinal fluid), and the peripheral chemoreceptors in the arterial blood for oxygen and carbon dioxide. Afferent neurons from the peripheral chemoreceptors are via the glossopharyngeal nerve (CN IX) and the vagus nerve (CN X).

The concentration of carbon dioxide (CO_{2}) rises in the blood when the metabolic use of oxygen (O_{2}), and the production of CO_{2} is increased during, for example, exercise. The CO_{2} in the blood is transported largely as bicarbonate (HCO_{3}^{−}) ions, by conversion first to carbonic acid (H_{2}CO_{3}), by the enzyme carbonic anhydrase, and then by disassociation of this acid to H^{+} and HCO_{3}^{−}. Build-up of CO_{2} therefore causes an equivalent build-up of the disassociated hydrogen ions, which, by definition, decreases the pH of the blood. The pH sensors on the brain stem immediately respond to this fall in pH, causing the respiratory center to increase the rate and depth of breathing. The consequence is that the partial pressure of CO_{2} (P_{CO_{2}}) does not change from rest going into exercise. During very short-term bouts of intense exercise the release of lactic acid into the blood by the exercising muscles causes a fall in the blood plasma pH, independently of the rise in the P_{CO_{2}}, and this will stimulate pulmonary ventilation sufficiently to keep the blood pH constant at the expense of a lowered P_{CO_{2}}.

Mechanical stimulation of the lungs can trigger certain reflexes as discovered in animal studies. In humans, these seem to be more important in neonates and ventilated patients, but of little relevance in health. The tone of respiratory muscle is believed to be modulated by muscle spindles via a reflex arc involving the spinal cord.

Drugs can greatly influence the rate of respiration. Opioids and anesthetics tend to depress ventilation, by decreasing the normal response to raised carbon dioxide levels in the arterial blood. Stimulants such as amphetamines can cause hyperventilation.

Pregnancy tends to increase ventilation (lowering plasma carbon dioxide tension below normal values). This is due to increased progesterone levels and results in enhanced gas exchange in the placenta.

=== Feedback control ===
Receptors play important roles in the regulation of respiration and include the central and peripheral chemoreceptors, and pulmonary stretch receptors, a type of mechanoreceptor.

- Central chemoreceptors of the central nervous system, located on the ventrolateral medullary surface, are sensitive to the pH of their environment.
- Peripheral chemoreceptors act most importantly to detect variation of the PO2 in the arterial blood, in addition to detecting arterial P_{CO_{2}} and pH.
- Mechanoreceptors are located in the airways and parenchyma, and are responsible for a variety of reflex responses. These include:
  - The Hering-Breuer reflex that terminates inhalation to prevent over inflation of the lungs, and the reflex responses of coughing, airway constriction, and hyperventilation.
  - The upper airway receptors are responsible for reflex responses such as, sneezing, coughing, closure of glottis, and hiccups.
  - The spinal cord reflex responses include the activation of additional respiratory muscles as compensation, gasping response, hypoventilation, and an increase in breathing frequency and volume.
  - The nasopulmonary and nasothoracic reflexes regulate the mechanism of breathing through deepening the inhale. Triggered by the flow of the air, the pressure of the air in the nose, and the quality of the air, impulses from the nasal mucosa are transmitted by the trigeminal nerve to the respiratory center in the brainstem, and the generated response is transmitted to the bronchi, the intercostal muscles and the diaphragm.
  - Head's paradoxical reflex where sudden inflation of the lung causes a transient respiratory effort or gasp.
