= Vasomotor center =

Portion of the medulla oblongata

Details
- Part of: Medulla

Identifiers
- Acronym: VMC
- MeSH: D014666

The vasomotor center (VMC) is a portion of the medulla oblongata. Together with the cardiovascular center and respiratory center, it regulates blood pressure. It also has a more minor role in other homeostatic processes. Upon increase in carbon dioxide level at central chemoreceptors, it stimulates the sympathetic system to constrict vessels. This is opposite to carbon dioxide in tissues causing vasodilatation, especially in the brain. Cranial nerves IX (glossopharyngeal nerve) and X (vagus nerve) both feed into the vasomotor centre and are themselves involved in the regulation of blood pressure.

== Structure ==
The vasomotor center is a collection of integrating neurons in the medulla oblongata of the middle brain stem. The term "vasomotor center" is not truly accurate, since this function relies not on a single brain structure ("center") but rather represents a network of interacting neurons. This center is located in the Rostral ventrolateral medulla.

=== Afferent fibres ===
The vasomotor center integrates nerve impulses from many places via the solitary nucleus:

- central chemoreceptors
- aortic body chemoreceptors, which send impulses via the vagus nerves
- carotid body chemoreceptors, which send impulses via the glossopharyngeal nerves
- aortic arch and brachiocephalic artery high-pressure baroreceptors, which send impulses via the aortic nerve
- carotid sinus high-pressure baroreceptors, which send impulses via the glossopharyngeal nerves

=== Efferent fibres ===
The vasomotor center gives off sympathetic fibres through the spinal cord and sympathetic ganglia, which reach vascular smooth muscle.

== Function ==
The vasomotor center changes vascular smooth muscle tone. This changes local and systemic blood pressure.

A drop in blood pressure leads to increased sympathetic tone from the vasomotor center. This acts to raise blood pressure.

== Clinical significance ==
Methyldopa acts on the vasomotor center, leading to selective stimulation of α_{2}-adrenergic receptor. Guanfacine also causes the same stimulation. This reduces sympathetic tone to vascular smooth muscle. This reduces heart rate and vascular resistance.

Digoxin increases vagal tone from the vasomotor centre, which decreases pulse.

G-series nerve agents have their most potent effect in the vasomotor center. Unlike other parts of the body, where continued stimulation of acetylcholine receptors leads to recoverable paralysis, overstimulation of the vasomotor center is often causes a fatal rise in blood pressure.

== History ==
The localization of vasomotor center was determined by Filipp Ovsyannikov in 1871.

== See also ==
- Rostral ventrolateral medulla
- cardiovascular center
