= Cardiovascular centre =

Brain region controlling cardiovascular functions

The cardiovascular centre is a part of the human brain which regulates heart rate through the nervous and endocrine systems. It is considered one of the vital centres of the medulla oblongata.

== Structure ==
The cardiovascular centre, or cardiovascular center, is part of the medulla oblongata of the brainstem. Normally, the heart beats without nervous control. In some situations, such as exercise, and major trauma, the cardiovascular centre is responsible for altering heart rate. It also mediates respiratory sinus arrhythmia.

== Function ==
The cardiovascular centre responds to a variety of types of sensory information, such as:

- change of blood pH, detected by central chemoreceptors.
- change of blood pH, detected by peripheral chemoreceptors in the aortic bodies and in the carotid bodies.
- change of blood pressure, detected by arterial baroreceptors in the aortic arch and the carotid sinuses.
- various other inputs from the hypothalamus, thalamus, and cerebral cortex.

The cardiovascular centre affects changes to the heart rate by sending a nerve impulse to the cardiac pacemaker via two sets of nerves:

- sympathetic fibres, part of the autonomic nervous system, to make heart rate faster.
- the vagus nerve, part of the parasympathetic branch of the autonomic nervous system, to lower heart rate.

The cardiovascular centre also increases the stroke volume of the heart (that is, the amount of blood it pumps). These two changes help to regulate the cardiac output, so that a sufficient amount of blood reaches tissues. This function is so significant to normal functioning of the circulatory system that the cardiovascular centre is considered a vital centre of the medulla oblongata.

Hormones like epinephrine and norepinephrine can affect the cardiovascular centre and cause it to increase the rate of impulses sent to the sinoatrial node, resulting in faster and stronger cardiac muscle contraction. This increases heart rate.

== Clinical significance ==
Many anaesthetics depress the activity of the cardiovascular center. Phencyclidine may be a useful anaesthetic because it does not impact the cardiovascular center. This also contrasts phencyclidine from many other recreational drugs.

== See also ==
- Vasomotor center
