= Solitariospinal tract =

Details
- Innervates: Indirectly: thoracic diaphragm, intercostal muscles

Identifiers
- Latin: tractus solitariospinalis
- FMA: 75695

The solitariospinal tract is a descending nerve tract that controls breathing by promoting the action of inspiratory muscles (note that exhalation is usually passive). It consists of a small group of axons originating in the solitary nucleus of the medulla oblongata, and projects to the motor neurons of the phrenic nerve (which innervate the thoracic diaphragm) and of motor neurons of the thoracic nerves (which innervate the intercostal muscles). In the spinal cord, it descends in the anterior funiculus (in MLF ) and (anterior portion of) lateral funiculus. Section of the anterior and lateral funiculi appears to abolish rhythmic breathing.

A similar, complimenting pathway also arises from the nucleus retroambiguus in the ventral respiratory group, but it additionally also projects to and promotes motor neurons of the muscles of expiration.
