= Glomus =

Glomus (Latin for 'ball of thread or yarn') can refer to:

- Glomus (fungus)
- Glomus tumor
- Coccygeal glomus
- Carotid glomus, another name for the carotid body
- Glomus cell
- Glomerulus, an anatomical term meaning "small ball"
