= Cell-based therapies for Parkinson's disease =

Treatment method for Parkinson's disease

A diagram of the rostral midbrain at the level of the superior colliculi. An area of the brain which degenerates in Parkinson's disease, called the substantia nigra pars compacta, is visualized as two dark brown bands in the lower half of the image.

Cell-based therapies for Parkinson's disease include various investigational procedures which transplant specific populations of cells into the brains of people with Parkinson's disease. The investigation of cell transplantation therapies followed the discovery that the death of dopaminergic neurons in the substantia nigra pars compacta resulted in the motor symptoms of the disease. Thus, cell transplantation has focused on various dopamine producing cells throughout the body.

== List of cell-based sources ==
- fetal ventral mesencephalic tissue (human and porcine)
- adrenal medulla
- sympathetic ganglia
- carotid body
- retinal pigment epithelium
- embryonic stem cells
- induced pluripotent stem cells
- mesenchymal stem cells
- human dopamine progenitor cells derived from autologous induced pluripotent stem cells (iPSCs)

=== Fetal ventral mesencephalic tissue ===
==== Porcine ====
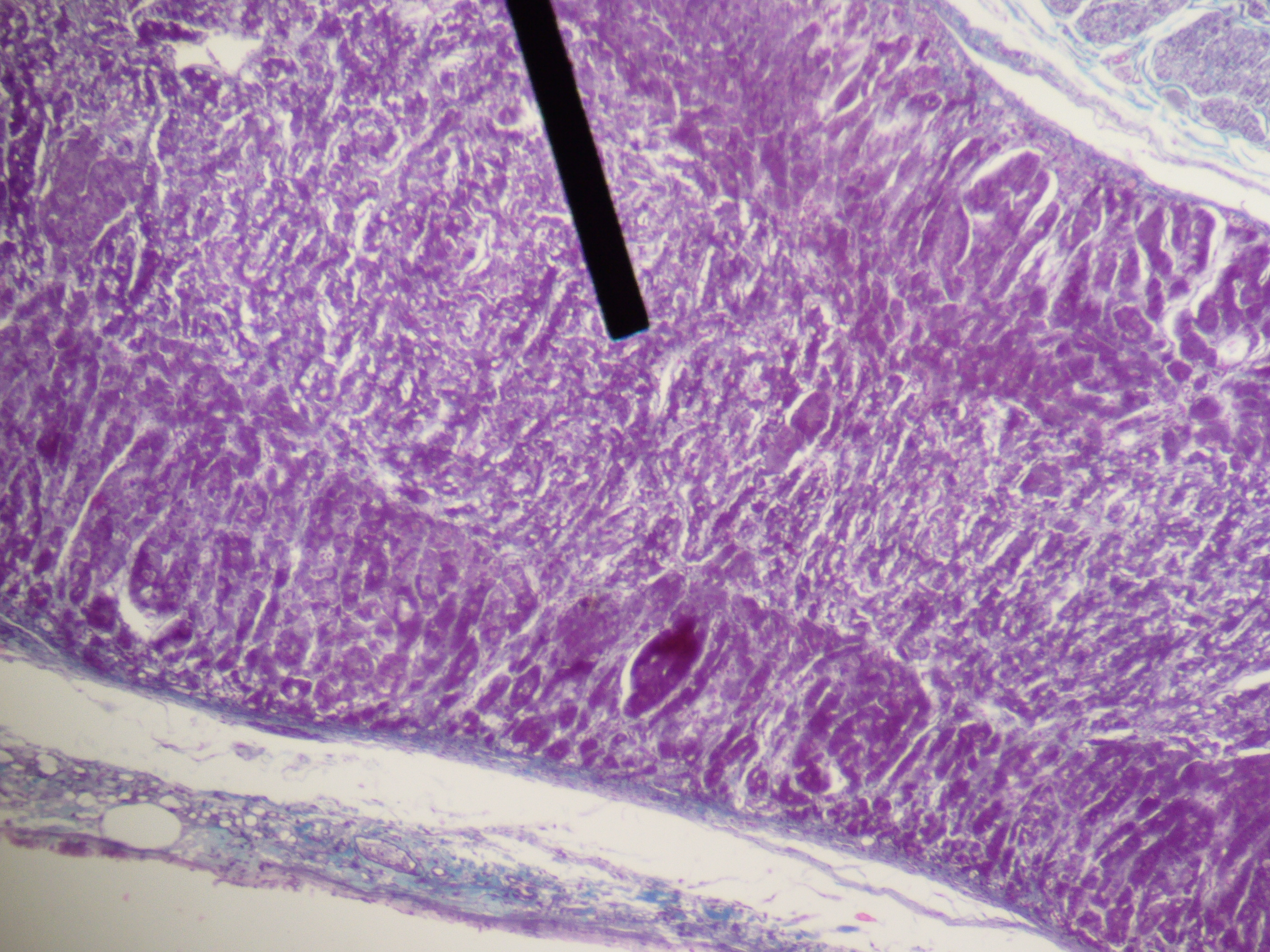
Histological section through the adrenal gland. The black pointer indicates the innermost layer known as the adrenal medulla.

=== Adrenal medulla ===
The first cell-based therapy investigated for Parkinson's disease utilized the adrenal medulla. The adrenal medulla is the innermost part of the adrenal gland and contains neural crest derived chromaffin cells which secrete norepinephrine, epinephrine and to a far lesser extent dopamine into the blood. Autotransplantation of adrenal medullary tissue into the brains of animal models of Parkinson's disease showed minimal benefits. Despite this, open-label trials were undergone in humans which showed only modest benefits. Following these initial disappointing results however, a trial in Mexico demonstrated significant motor benefits in two patients with Parkinson's disease who had undergone the procedure. This publication incited widespread interest in the field and over the next few years hundreds of patients received adrenal medulla transplants. It was only when a registry was set up to consolidate all the data was it revealed that most patients did not benefit from the procedure to any significant extent. Furthermore, postoperative complications such as psychiatric disturbances were realized. These combined findings eventually led to the abandonment of this transplant procedure, which was largely flawed from the start.

=== Sympathetic ganglia ===
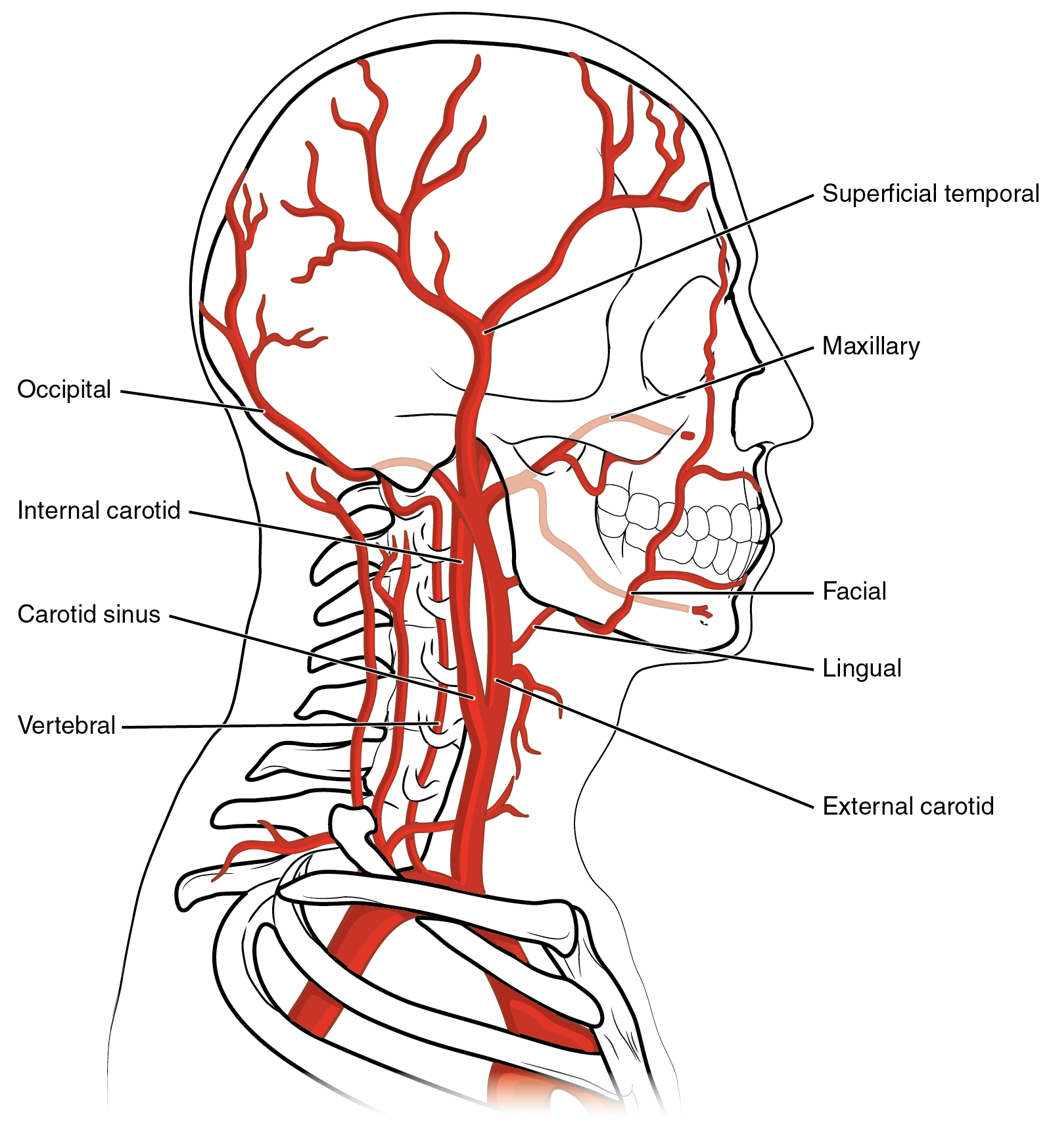
A diagram of the arterial supply to the head and neck. The common carotid artery can be seen bifurcating into the internal carotid artery and external carotid artery. The carotid body is found at the bifurcation of the common carotid artery, in the same location as the carotid sinus.

=== Carotid body ===
The carotid body is a group of chemoreceptor cells located at the bifurcation of the common carotid artery. It includes two populations of cells; glomus (type I) cells and sustentacular (type II) cells. Glomus cells are derived from the neural crest and secrete dopamine in response to hypoxemia (low level of oxygen in the blood). Based on their ability to secrete dopamine and also glial cell-derived neurotrophic factor (GDNF), these cells have been investigated as an intrastriatal autograft therapy for patients with Parkinson's disease. A clinical trial exploring this initially demonstrated motor benefits, unfortunately these benefits disappeared after 6–12 months, in correlation with poor survival of the grafted cells.

=== Retinal pigment epithelium ===
The retinal pigment epithelium (RPE) is a single layer of melanin containing cells located between the neural retina and the choroid. Retinal pigment epithelial cells synthesize dopamine and secrete the neurotrophic factors glial-cell derived neurotrophic factor (GDNF) and brain-derived neurotrophic factor (BDNF). Initial trials of intrastriatal allografts of cultured human retinal pigment epithelial cells attached to microcarriers (Spheramine, Bayer Schering Pharma AG) demonstrated the ability to secrete dopamine, GDNF and BNDF. Additionally, the intrastriatal allografts were able survive in the host.

=== Stem cells ===
==== Fetal Stem Cells ====
The first know study done with stem cells was a proof of concept study done in 1989. This study injected human fetal stem cells (FSCs) in the striatum of two patients to replace lost neurons. The patients showed subtle improvements. Future studies have had some success with the graft having a study supply of dopaminergic (DA). In these studies, some patient's conditions improved, while other patients saw no improvement or even worsening conditions. Results have been inconsistent and not reproducible. The next steps are to make fetal stem cells a more reliable in a larger variety of patients.

==== Mesenchymal Stem Cells ====
Mesenchymal stem cells (MSCs) secrete growth factors such as glial-cell derived neurotrophic factor (GDNF), brain-derived neurotrophic factor (BDNF), and nerve growth factor (NGF) which help to promote tissue regrowth and regenerate dopaminergic (DA) neurons. MSCs are also beneficial due to their anti-inflammatory effect as well as being non tumorigenic limiting ethical concerns. Preliminary studies have been done using mice. These studies have shown that MSCs have improved cognitive function, motor function, increased growth hormones and restored dopaminergic (DA) neurons. Additionally, there were anti-inflammatory effects observed in the mice. Some challenges that occur include low graft survivability, a limited amount of neuronal differentiation, and fluctuations in the effectiveness of the treatment. More research is still needed to be conducted including studies in non-human primates and careful clinical trials.
