= Gierek =

Gierek may refer to:

== People ==
- Adam Gierek (born 1938), Polish post-communism politician and son of Edward Gierek
- Ariadna Gierek-Łapińska (1938–2020), Polish ophthalmologist and professor
- Edward Gierek (1913–2001), Polish communist politician
- Stanisława Gierek (1918–2007), wife of Edward Gierek

== See also ==
- Gierek decade, in the history of Poland
- Gerek, Horasan, Turkey
- Gierke (disambiguation)
