= Glomus cell =

Chemoreceptive and support cells

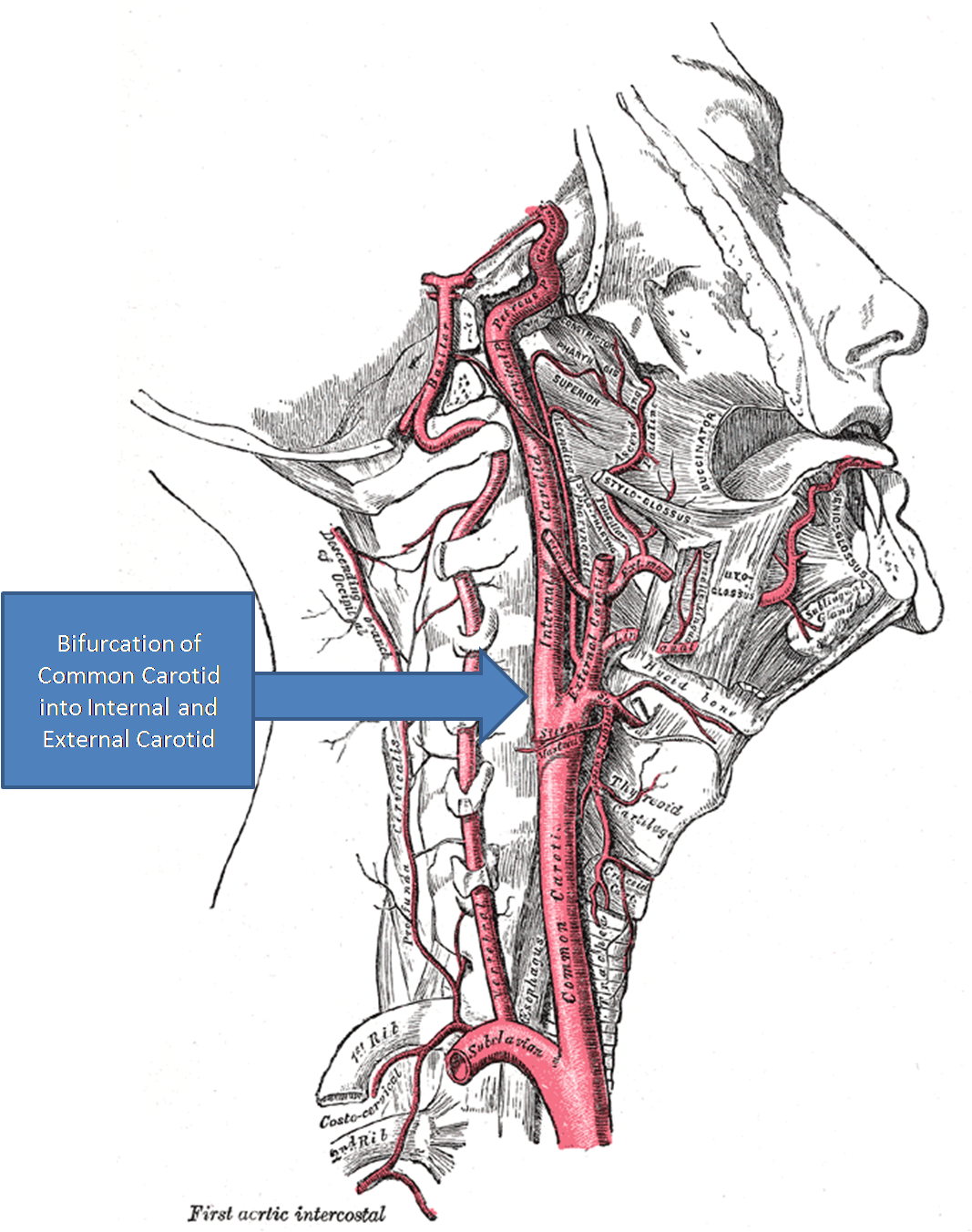
The carotid body is not labelled but is located within the wall of the internal carotid artery near the bifurcation of the common carotid artery. Glomus type I cells are the chemoreceptor cells found in the carotid body.

Glomus cells are the cell type mainly located in the carotid bodies and aortic bodies. Glomus type I cells are peripheral chemoreceptors which sense the oxygen, carbon dioxide and pH levels of the blood. When there is a decrease in the blood's pH, a decrease in oxygen (pO_{2}), or an increase in carbon dioxide (pCO_{2}), the carotid bodies and the aortic bodies signal the dorsal respiratory group in the medulla oblongata to increase the volume and rate of breathing. The glomus cells have a high metabolic rate and good blood perfusion and thus are sensitive to changes in arterial blood gas tension. Glomus type II cells are sustentacular cells having a similar supportive function to glial cells.

== Structure ==
The signalling within the chemoreceptors is thought to be mediated by the release of neurotransmitters by the glomus cells, including dopamine, noradrenaline, acetylcholine, substance P, vasoactive intestinal peptide and enkephalins. Vasopressin has been found to inhibit the response of glomus cells to hypoxia, presumably because the usual response to hypoxia is vasodilation, which in case of hypovolemia should be avoided. Furthermore, glomus cells are highly responsive to angiotensin II through AT1 receptors, providing information about the body's fluid and electrolyte status.

== Function ==
Glomus type I cells are chemoreceptors which monitor arterial blood for the partial pressure of oxygen (pO_{2}), partial pressure of carbon dioxide (pCO_{2}) and pH.

Glomus type I cells are secretory sensory neurons that release neurotransmitters in response to hypoxemia (low pO_{2}), hypercapnia (high pCO_{2}) or acidosis (low pH). Signals are transmitted to the afferent nerve fibers of the sinus nerve and may include dopamine, acetylcholine, and adenosine. This information is sent to the respiratory center and helps the brain to regulate breathing.

== Innervation ==
The glomus type I cells of the carotid body are innervated by the sensory neurons found in the inferior ganglion of the glossopharyngeal nerve. The carotid sinus nerve is the branch of the glossopharyngeal nerve which innervates them. Alternatively, the glomus type I cells of the aortic body are innervated by sensory neurons found in the inferior ganglion of the vagus nerve. Centrally the axons of neurons which innervate glomus type I cells synapse in the caudal portion of the solitary nucleus in the medulla. Glomus type II cells are not innervated.

== Development ==
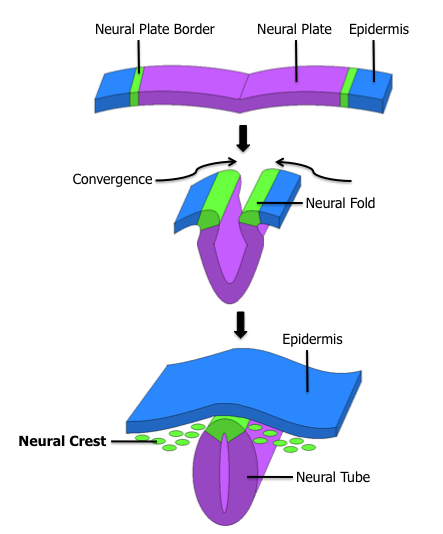
Development of the nervous system. The glomus type I cells of the carotid body are derived from the neural crest and can be seen in green.

Glomus type I cells are embryonically derived from the neural crest. In the carotid body the respiratory chemoreceptors need a period of time postnatally in order to reach functional maturity. This maturation period is known as resetting. At birth the chemorecptors express a low sensitivity for lack of oxygen but this increases over the first few days or weeks of life. The mechanisms underlying the postnatal maturity of chemotransduction are obscure.

== Clinical significance ==
Clusters of glomus cells, of which the carotid bodies and aortic bodies are the most important, are called non-chromaffin or parasympathetic paraganglia. They are also present along the vagus nerve, in the inner ears, in the lungs, and at other sites. Neoplasms of glomus cells are known as paraganglioma, among other names, they are generally non-malignant.

== Research ==
The autotransplantation of glomus cells of the carotid body into the striatum – a nucleus in the forebrain - has been investigated as a cell-based therapy for people with Parkinson's disease.

== See also ==
List of distinct cell types in the adult human body
