= Gierke =

Gierke or von Gierke could refer to:

- Edgar von Gierke (1877–1945), German physician
  - Glycogen storage disease type I, also known as von Gierke disease, named for Edgar von Gierke
- H. F. Gierke III (1943–2016), American jurist
- Hans Paul Bernhard Gierke (1847–1886), German anatomist
  - Solitary tract, sometimes known as the Gierke respiratory bundle, named for Hans Paul Bernhard Gierke
- Henning von Gierke, German artist and set designer
- Otto von Gierke (1841–1921), German legal scholar and historian
