= Aortic nerve =

Branch of the vagus nerve

Details
- From: vagus nerve
- Innervates: baroreceptors and chemoreceptors of the aortic arch

Identifiers
- Latin: Nervus aortae

The aortic nerve, also known as the aortic depressor nerve, is a branch of the vagus nerve. It supplies autonomic afferent nerve fibers to the peripheral baroreceptors and chemoreceptors found in the aortic arch and in the brachiocephalic artery.

== Structure ==
The aortic nerve is an autonomic afferent nerve. Its fibers run from the peripheral baroreceptors and chemoreceptors found in the aortic arch and the bifurcation of the brachiocephalic artery to the solitary nucleus. It joins the vagus nerve. This allows for impulses to reach the solitary tract of the brainstem.

== Function ==
The aortic nerve is part of the nerve pathway that allows for afferent impulses to be sent from the aortic arch to the medulla oblongata for control of the circulatory system.

== History ==
The aortic nerve was allegedly discovered by Jewish Russian-French physiologist Elias von Cyon and German physician Carl Ludwig.
