= Wilhelm Krause =

German anatomist (1833–1910)

Johann Friedrich Wilhelm Krause (12 July 1833 – 4 February 1910) was a German anatomist born in Hanover. He was the son of anatomist Karl Friedrich Theodor Krause (1797–1868).

Krause studied at Göttingen, where he became member of the Burschenschaft Hannovera (fraternity). He earned his medical doctorate in 1854 and became an associate professor at the University of Göttingen in 1860. In 1892 he was appointed head of the Anatomical Institute Laboratory in Berlin.

Krause discovered and described mechanoreceptors that were to become known as "Krause's corpuscles", sometimes referred to as "Krause's end-bulbs". His name is also associated with:

- "Krause's membranes": defined as isotropic bands in striated muscle fiber that consist of disks of sarcoplasm and connect the individual fibrils. Also known as Z-Disc or Dobie's line.
- "Krause respiratory bundle": a fiber bundle that is also known as the "solitary tract". Sometimes referred to as "Gierke respiratory bundle", named in honor of anatomist Hans Paul Bernhard Gierke.

Krause also researched in the field of embryology. Among his students at Göttingen was bacteriologist Robert Koch (1843–1910). Krause is credited with the publication of over 100 medical articles.

== Written works ==
- Die terminalen Körperchen der einfach sensiblen Nerven. Hannover, (Treatise on Krause's corpuscles), 1860
- Anatomische Untersuchungen, 1861.
- Die Trichinenkrankheit und ihre Verhütung
- Uber die Nervenendigung in der Geschlectsorganen, 1866.
- Ueber die Allantois des Menschen, 1875.
- Handbuch der menschlichen Anatomie. (Third edition of his father's work) 3 volumes; Hanover, 1876, 1879, 1880.
- Die Anatomie des Kaninchens, publisher: Leipzig: Engelmann, 1884.
