= Victor Derély =

French man of letters and translator

Victor Derély (1840–1904) was a French man of letters and translator.

Born in Paris and a former student of the École normale supérieure, Derély was an important translator of Russian literature of the last quarter of the nineteenth century. Translating relatively little, he is best known for his translations of Dostoyevsky: Crime and Punishment, The Idiot, Demons, Poor Folk. He also translated Aleksey Pisemsky, Elias von Cyon, Nadezhda Khvoshchinskaya, Ivan Sechenov and Nikolai Leskov.

== Works ==
- 1876: Nouveaux morceaux choisis de poètes et de prosateurs latins, recueillis et annotés
- 1884: Le Crime et le Châtiment, 1884, was the first French translation of Fyodor Dostoyevsky's novel.

== Sources ==
- Victor Derély
- Jean-Claude Polet, Patrimoine littéraire européen: anthologie en langue française. Index général, Brussels: De Boeck université, 2000, p. 358 Read online
