= Cough center =

Region of the brain which controls coughing

The cough center is a region of the brain which controls coughing. The cough center is located in the medulla oblongata in the brainstem. Cough suppressants focus their action on the cough center.

== Structure ==
The exact location and functionality of the cough center has remained somewhat elusive: while Johannes Peter Müller observed in 1838 that the medulla coordinates the cough reflex, investigating it has been slow because the usual anaesthetics for experimental animals were morphine or opiates, drugs which strongly inhibit cough. In addition, the center likely overlaps with the respiratory rhythm generator networks. It is hence not so much a specific area, but a function within the respiration and reflex networks of the brainstem.

Cough receptors project to relay neurones in the solitary nucleus, which project to other parts of the respiratory networks. In particular, the pre-Bötzinger complex may act as a pattern generator for the cough response. Parts of the caudal medullary raphe nucleus (nucleus raphe obscurus and nucleus raphe magnus) are known to be essential for the cough response. Other systems that may be involved in pattern generation and regulation are the pontine respiratory group, the lateral tegmental field and the deep cerebellar nuclei. Successful joint models of medullary systems coordinating breathing, coughing and swallowing have been constructed based on this model.

Coughing can occur or be inhibited as a voluntary action, suggesting control from higher systems in the brain. Functional brain imaging of voluntary, suppressed, and induced coughing show that a number of higher-order brain areas can get involved and may be important even for involuntary coughing. In contrast, voluntary coughing does not seem to activate medullary systems.

== See also ==
- Cough reflex
- Respiratory center
