= Respiratory rate =

Number of breaths per unit time

The respiratory rate is the rate at which breathing occurs; it is set and controlled by the respiratory center of the brain. A person's respiratory rate is usually measured in breaths per minute.

== Measurement ==
The respiratory rate in humans is measured by counting the number of breaths occur in a given amount of time through counting how many times the chest rises. A fibre-optic breath rate sensor can be used for monitoring patients during a magnetic resonance imaging scan. Respiration rates may increase with fever, illness, or other medical conditions.

Inaccuracies in respiratory measurement have been reported in the literature. One study compared respiratory rate counted using a 90-second count period, to a full minute, and found significant differences in the rates.. Another study found that rapid respiratory rates in babies, counted using a stethoscope, were 60–80% higher than those counted visually without the aid of the stethoscope. Similar results are seen with animals when they are being handled and not being handled – the invasiveness of touch apparently is enough to make significant changes in breathing.

Various other methods to measure respiratory rate are commonly used, including impedance pneumography and capnography, which are commonly implemented in patient monitoring. In addition, novel techniques for automatically monitoring respiratory rate using wearable sensors are in development, such as estimation of respiratory rate from the electrocardiography, photoplethysmography, or accelerometry signals.

Breathing rate is often interchanged with breathing frequency. However, this should not be considered the frequency of breathing because realistic breathing signal is composed of many frequencies.

== Normal range ==
For humans, the typical respiratory rate for a healthy adult at rest is 12–15 breaths per minute. The respiratory center sets the quiet respiratory rhythm at around two seconds for an inhalation and three seconds exhalation. This gives the lower bound of the range of twelve breaths per minute.

Average resting respiratory rates by age are:

- birth to 6 weeks: 30–40 breaths per minute
- 6 months: 25–40 breaths per minute
- 3 years: 20–30 breaths per minute
- 6 years: 18–25 breaths per minute
- 10 years: 17–23 breaths per minute
- Adults: 15–18 breaths per minute
- 50 years: 18–25 breaths per minute
- Elderly ≥ 65 years old: 12–28 breaths per minute.
- Elderly ≥ 80 years old: 10–30 breaths per minute.

== Minute volume ==
Respiratory minute volume is the volume of air which is inhaled (inhaled minute volume) or exhaled (exhaled minute volume) from the lungs in one minute.

== Diagnostic value ==
The value of respiratory rate as an indicator of potential respiratory dysfunction has been investigated but findings suggest it is of limited value.

One study found that only 33% of people presenting to an emergency department with an oxygen saturation below 90% had an increased respiratory rate. An evaluation of respiratory rate for the differentiation of the severity of illness in babies under six months of age found it not to be very useful. Approximately half of the babies had a respiratory rate above 50 breaths per minute, clearly limiting the value of considering rates above 50 breaths per minute to indicate serious respiratory illness.

It has also been reported that factors such as crying, sleeping, agitation and age significantly influence respiratory rates.

Nonetheless, respiratory rate is widely used to monitor the physiology of acutely-ill hospital patients. It is measured regularly to facilitate identification of changes in physiology along with other vital signs. This practice has been widely adopted as part of early warning systems.

== Abnormal respiratory rates ==
- Apnea
- Biot's respiration
- Bradypnea
- Cheyne-Stokes respiration
- Dyspnea
- Hyperpnea
- Hypopnea
- Kussmaul breathing
- Orthopnea
- Platypnea
- Tachypnea

== See also ==
- Subparabrachial nucleus – nucleus in the brain stem that regulates breathing rate
- Respiratory system
- Heart rate, pulse, systolic and diastolic blood pressure measurements, and the level of oxygen saturation – and some other vital signs – can provide information about the heart, lungs and the great vessels, since these systems work with one another, are relatively close together in gross (macroscopic) anatomy, and are physiologically closely related.
