= Pneumograph =

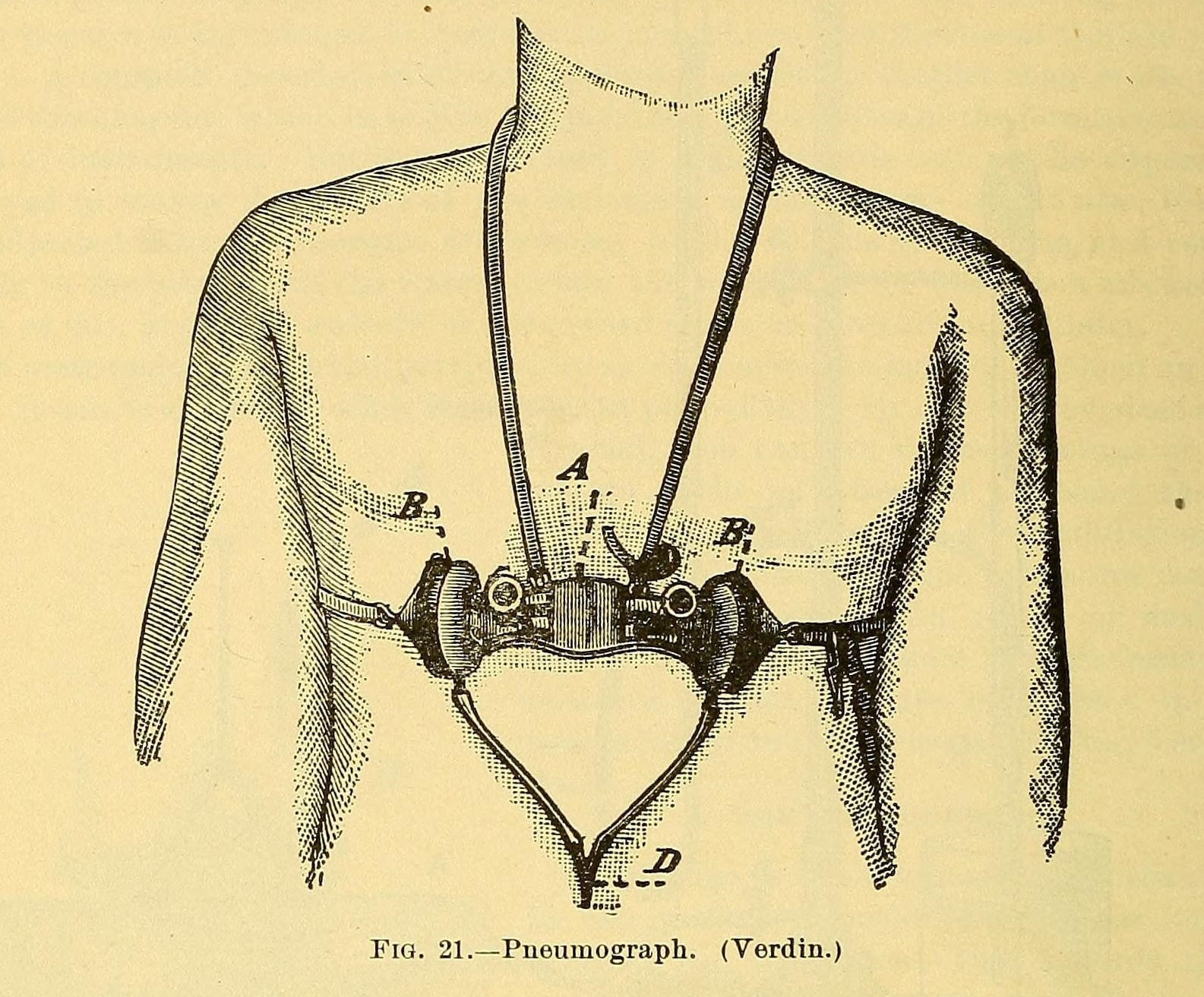
- Illustration
- Synonyms: pneumatograph or spirograph
- Purpose: To record velocity and force of chest movements in respiration

A pneumograph, also known as a pneumatograph or spirograph, is a device for recording velocity and force of chest movements during respiration. While spirometry measures respiratory rate and other markers of respiratory health via analysis of the airflow from the lungs during inhalation and exhalation, pneumography measures the respiratory rate via chest motion.

== Principle of operation ==
There are various kinds of pneumographic devices, which have different principles of operation.

=== Mechanical ===
In one mechanism, a flexible rubber vessel is attached to the chest. The vessel is equipped with sensors such as accelerometers, piezoelectric sensors, or a fiber Bragg grating to measure chest motion and obtain respiratory rate.

=== Electrical ===
Other mechanisms are impedance based. In these methods, a high-frequency (tens to hundreds of kHz), low-amplitude current is injected across the chest cavity. The voltage resulting from this current injection is measured and the resistance is derived from the application of Ohm's law: $Z = \frac{V}{I}$. Current flows less easily through the chest as the lungs fill, so the resistance rises with increasing lung volume.
