= Peripheral chemoreceptor =

Sensory receptors that detect changes in chemical concentrations

Peripheral chemoreceptors (of the carotid and aortic bodies) are so named because they are sensory extensions of the peripheral nervous system into blood vessels where they detect changes in chemical concentrations. As transducers of patterns of variability in the surrounding environment, carotid and aortic bodies count as chemosensors in a similar way as taste buds and photoreceptors. However, because carotid and aortic bodies detect variation within the body's internal organs, they are considered interoceptors. Taste buds, olfactory bulbs, photoreceptors, and other receptors associated with the five traditional sensory modalities, by contrast, are exteroceptors in that they respond to stimuli outside the body. The body also contains proprioceptors, which respond to the amount of stretch within the organ, usually muscle, that they occupy.

As for their particular function, peripheral chemoreceptors help maintain homeostasis in the cardiorespiratory system by monitoring concentrations of blood borne chemicals. These polymodal sensors respond to variations in a number of blood properties, including low oxygen (hypoxia), high carbon dioxide (hypercapnia), and low glucose (hypoglycemia). Hypoxia and hypercapnia are the most heavily studied and understood conditions detected by the peripheral chemoreceptors. Glucose is discussed in a later section. Afferent nerves carry signals back from the carotid and aortic bodies to the brainstem, which responds accordingly (e.g. increasing ventilation).

== Structure ==
Both carotid bodies and aortic bodies increase sensory discharge during hypoxia. Carotid bodies are considered the primary peripheral chemoreceptor and have been shown to contribute more to a hypoxic response. However, in the chronic absence of the carotid body, the aortic body is able to perform a similar respiratory regulatory role, suggesting that it possesses efficacious mechanisms of signal transduction as well. The differing locations of the two bodies ideally position them to take advantage of different information; the carotid bodies, located on one of the main arteries of the neck, monitor partial pressure within arterial vessels while aortic body, located on the aortic arch, monitors oxygen concentration closer to the heart. Each of these bodies is composed of a similar collection of cells, and it is the post-transduction signal processing that differentiates their responses. However, little is known about the specifics of either of these signaling mechanisms.

=== Microanatomy ===
Carotid and aortic bodies are clusters of cells located on the common carotid artery and the aortic arch, respectively. Each of these peripheral chemoreceptors is composed of type I glomus cells and glia-like type II cells. The type-I cells transduce the signals from the bloodstream and are innervated by afferent nerve fibers leading back to (in the carotid body) the carotid sinus nerve and then on to the glossopharyngeal nerve and medulla of the brainstem. The aortic body, by contrast, is connected to the medulla via the vagus nerve.

They also receive input from efferent nerve fibers leading back to the same set of nerves. The entire cluster of cells is infiltrated with capillaries to provide access to the bloodstream; the high capillary density makes this one of the areas of the body with the greatest blood flow. Type I cells are densely packed with vesicles containing various neurotransmitters, including dopamine, ATP, serotonin, catecholamine, released during transduction. Type I cells are often connected via gap junctions, which might allow for quick communication between cells when transducing signals.

Type II cells occur in a ratio of about 1 to 4 with type I cells. Their long bodies usually occur in close association with type I cells, though they do not entirely encase type I cells. They lack the vesicles of type I cells used in neurotransmitter communication, but studies indicate they function as chemoreceptor stem cells and can respond to prolonged exposure to hypoxia by proliferating into type I cells themselves. They may also bolster rapid communication among type I cells by amplifying release of one of the primary neurotransmitters in chemoreceptive signaling, ATP.

=== Development ===
Sensitivity and physiology of the peripheral chemoreceptors changes throughout the lifespan.

==== Infancy ====
Respiration in neonates is irregular, prone to periodic breathing and apnea. In utero and at birth, the carotid body's response to hypoxia is not fully developed; it takes a few days to a few weeks to increase its sensitivity to that of an adult carotid body. During this period of development, it is proposed that neonates heavily rely on other oxygen-sensing chemoreceptors, such as the aortic body or central chemoreceptors. However, non-carotid body chemoreceptors are sometimes not enough to ensure appropriate ventilatory response; SIDS deaths occur most frequently during the days or weeks in which the carotid body is still developing, and it is suggested that lack of appropriate carotid body activity is implicated in this condition. SIDS victims often are reported to have displayed some of the characteristic troubles in carotid body development, including periodic breathing, much sleep apnea, impaired arousal during sleep, and low sensitivity to hypoxia. The carotid bodies of SIDS victims also often display physiological abnormalities, such as hypo- and hypertrophy. Many of the findings on to carotid body's relation to SIDS report that carotid body development is impaired by environmental factors that were already known to increase the risk of SIDS, such as premature birth and exposure to smoke, substances of abuse, hyperoxia, and hypoxia, so it may seem initially as if carotid body studies are only extending what we know about SIDS into another domain. However, understanding the mechanisms that impair carotid body development could help elucidate how certain aspects of neonatal, particularly premature, care might be improved. For example, oxygen therapy may be an example of a technique that exposes premature infants to such high oxygen levels that it prevents them from acquiring appropriate sensitivity to normal oxygen levels.

==== Pregnancy ====
Increased base rate of ventilation and sensitivity to both hypoxia and hypercapnia occur in pregnant women after gestation week 20, and studies suggest this is due at least in part to changes in peripheral chemoreceptor sensitivity. Similar changes in sensitivity have been found in women administered levels of hormones that mimic the stage of the pregnancy in which these effects being to appear, suggesting that carotid and aortic body sensitivity is modulated by neuroendocrine processes. However, findings tying peripheral chemoreceptors to pregnancy-induced variations in breathing could just be correlational, so further studies are needed to identify the cause behind this relation.

== Physiology ==
=== Signal transduction ===
Peripheral chemoreceptors were identified as necessary to breathing regulation much sooner than their mechanisms for acquiring information from the bloodstream were beginning to be understood. Both carotid and aortic bodies are composed of type I and type II cells and are believed to transduce signals from blood chemicals in the same way, though post-transduction signal communication may differ. Chemosensory transduction in these receptors is still an active area of research, and not all studies agree, but there is growing support for a transduction mechanism dependent upon mitochondrial consumption of oxygen affecting the AMPK enzyme.

Transferring the signal to the medulla requires that neurotransmitter be released from the vesicles in the type I cells, and as with many other neural cells, this is triggered by an influx of calcium into the cell after membrane depolarization. The process of identifying signal transduction in interoceptors such as the peripheral chemoreceptors requires moving backward from membrane depolarization to discover the previous steps, often internal to the cell, that transduces blood chemicals to a neural signal. Up to this point, most research agrees that membrane depolarization is caused by inhibition of potassium channels that otherwise maintain the resting potential. As to the step before potassium channel inhibition, many mechanisms are proposed, none of which receive unanimous support from the research community. Multiple types of potassium channels respond to hypoxia, with significant differences between different species, and a number of different types for each species. Expression of potassium channels also changes throughout the lifetime. Some studies propose that heme-oxygenase 2 is the transducer; however, since its deletion in mice does not affect chemoreceptor oxygen sensitivity, this hypothesis is open to question. Another enzyme, AMP-activated protein kinase (AMPK), provides a mechanism that could apply not only to all types of potassium channels but also other oxygen-sensing tissues in the body, such as pulmonary vasculature and neonatal chromaffin cells. AMPK is an enzyme activated by an increase in the AMP:ATP ratio resulting from increasing cellular respiration. Once activated, the enzyme promotes production of ATP and suppresses reactions that consume it. AMPK activation is also a more appealing candidate because it can activate both of the two most common types of potassium channels. Another study identified that AMPK opens and closes potassium channels via phosphorylation, further underlining the link between the two. The role of AMPK in oxygen sensing in type-1 cells has however also recently been called into question.

This enzyme's function positions type I cells to uniquely take advantage of their mitochondria. However, AMPK is an enzyme found in many more types of cells than chemoreceptors because it helps regulate metabolism. The difference may actually lie in the cell's metabolism, rather than the AMPK enzyme; peripheral chemoreceptors display very high background rates of oxygen consumption, supported by its dense network of capillaries. Since its base rate of cellular respiration is so high, its AMPK would be more sensitive to reductions in blood borne oxygen, thus allowing it to respond to small variations in oxygen content before other cells begin to feel the effects of its absence. In this way, transduction in peripheral chemoreceptor cells is relatively unique. It does not require any specialized proteins that change shape in the presence of light or a specific receptor site for a particular tastant. Its necessary components include merely the mitochondria and an enzyme used to regulate its activity common to all aerobic cells, a suite of potassium and calcium channels and neurotransmitters common to many types of nerve cells, and a well-endowed version of the vasculature supporting all aerobic cells. Further research should identify why type I cells exhibit such a high metabolic rate compared to other cell types, as this may be the truly unique feature of the receptor. And thus, a receptor for an aerobic organism's most basic energy source is composed of collection of cell structures common throughout the body.

=== Response to hypoxia ===
Peripheral chemoreceptors are put under stress in a number of situations involving low access to oxygen, including exercise and exposure to high altitude. Under sustained hypoxic stress, regardless of the cause, peripheral chemoreceptors show a great deal of plasticity; they will both swell the size of chemosensing cells and increase their number. Though researchers were previously unsure how carotid and aortic bodies came to increase their numbers so rapidly, recent findings point to the type II cells, which were previously thought to have only a supportive role and are now believed to retain properties of stem cells and can differentiate into type I transducer cells.

Peripheral chemoreceptors respond to increased CO_{2} as much as five times as rapidly as central chemoreceptor (which also sense CO_{2} levels) - therefore, peripheral chemoreceptors may be crucial in rapidly increasing the ventilatory rate upon sudden onset of strenuous physical activity. Several studies suggest peripheral chemoreceptors play a role in ventilation during exercise. However, there is disagreement about whether they perform an excitatory or inhibitory role. Several studies point to increased circulation of catecholamine or potassium during exercise as a potential effector on peripheral chemoreceptors; however, the specifics of this effect are not yet understood. All suggestions of peripheral chemoreceptor involvement conclude that they are not solely accountable for this response, emphasizing that these receptors are only one in a suite of oxygen-sensing cells that can respond in times of stress. Collecting information on carotid and aortic body activity in live, exercising humans is fraught with difficulty and often only indicates indirect evidence, so it is hard to draw expansive conclusions until more evidence has been amassed, and hopefully with more advanced techniques.

In addition to ventilatory effects, peripheral chemoreceptors may influence neuroendocrine responses to exercise that can influence activities other than ventilation. Circulation of the glucose-promoting hormone, glucagon and a neurotransmitter, norepinephrine, is increased in carotid- and aortic-body-enervated dogs, suggesting that peripheral chemoreceptors respond to low glucose levels in and may respond to other neuroendocrine signals in addition to what is traditionally considered to be their sole role of ventilatory regulation.

=== Role of central chemoreceptors ===
Peripheral chemoreceptors work in concert with central chemoreceptors, which also monitor blood CO_{2} but do it in the cerebrospinal fluid surrounding the brain. A high concentration of central chemoreceptors is found in the ventral medulla, the brainstem area that receives input from peripheral chemoreceptors. Taken together, these blood oxygen monitors contribute nerve signals to the vasomotor center of the medulla which can modulate several processes, including breathing, airway resistance, blood pressure, and arousal. At an evolutionary level, this stabilization of oxygen levels, which also results in a more constant carbon dioxide concentration and pH, was important to manage oxygen flow in air-vs.-water breathing, sleep, and to maintain an ideal pH for protein structure, since fluctuations in pH can denature a cell's enzymes.

== See also ==
- Central chemoreceptors
- Chemoreceptors
- Control of respiration
