= Filipp Ovsyannikov =

Russian surgeon (1827–1906)

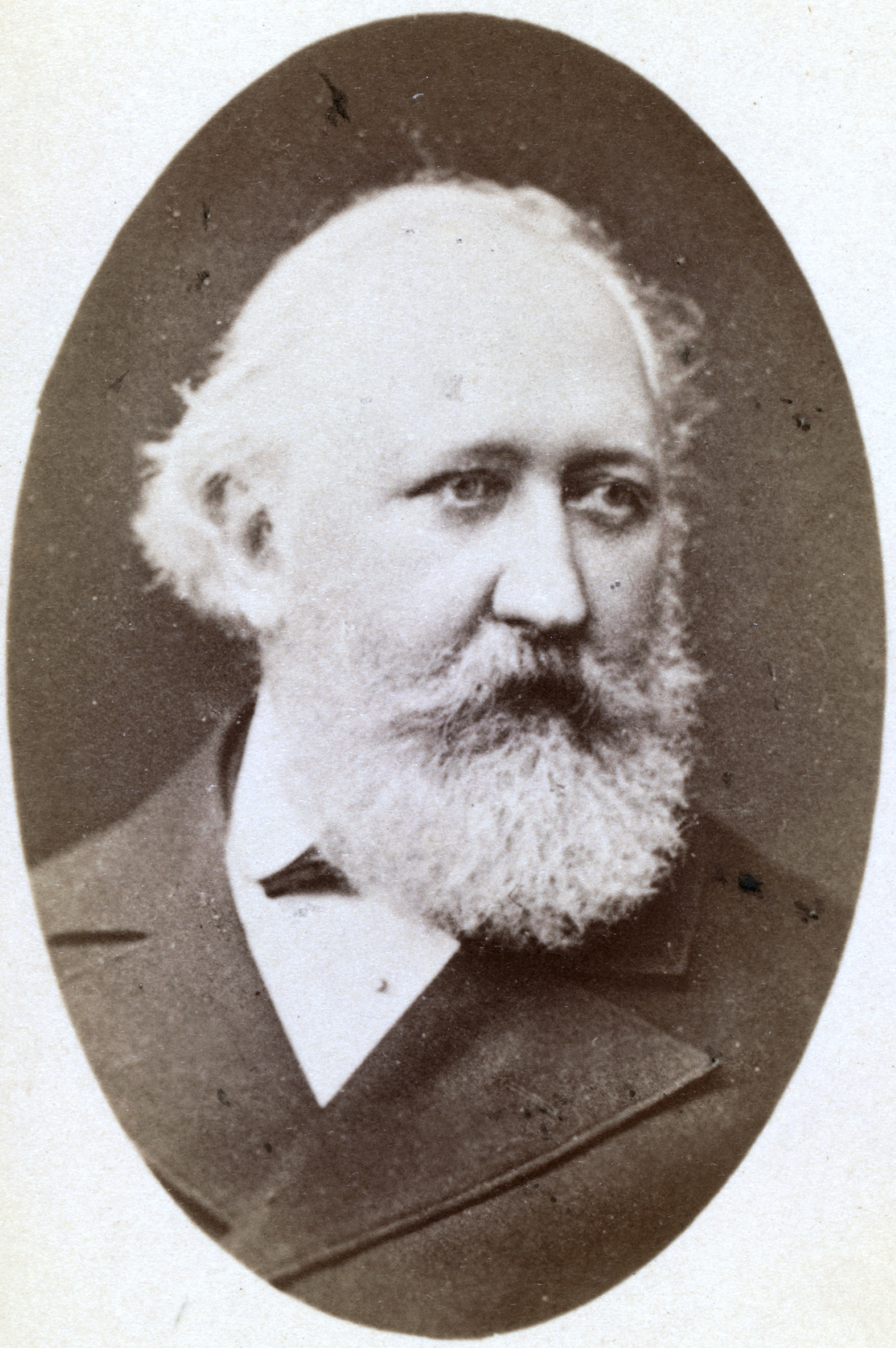
Filipp Ovsyannikov

Filipp Vasilievich Ovsyannikov (Russian: Филипп Васильевич Овсянников; 26 June [O.S. 14 June] 1827–11 June [O.S. 29 May] 1906) was the first Russian histologist and the founder of sturgeon breeding.

Ovsyannikov graduated from the Imperial University of Dorpat in 1853. He worked in Claude Bernard's laboratory in 1860 and in Carl Ludwig's laboratory in 1869. He held the chair in physiology at the University of Kazan from 1858 to 1862 and the chair in anatomy at the University of Saint Petersburg from 1864 to 1886. In 1864, he established the Physiological Laboratory for the Petersburg Academy of Sciences. Ovsyannikov's laboratory was used for research by such young physiologists as Elias von Cyon and Ivan Pavlov.

In 1869, Ovsyannikov pioneered artificial reproduction of sterlet. A series of experiments with fish breeding won him a gold medal from the Free Economic Society. In 1871, he discovered the vasomotor center and determined its precise limits in the medulla oblongata.
