= Elias von Cyon =

Russian and French physiologist (1843–1912)

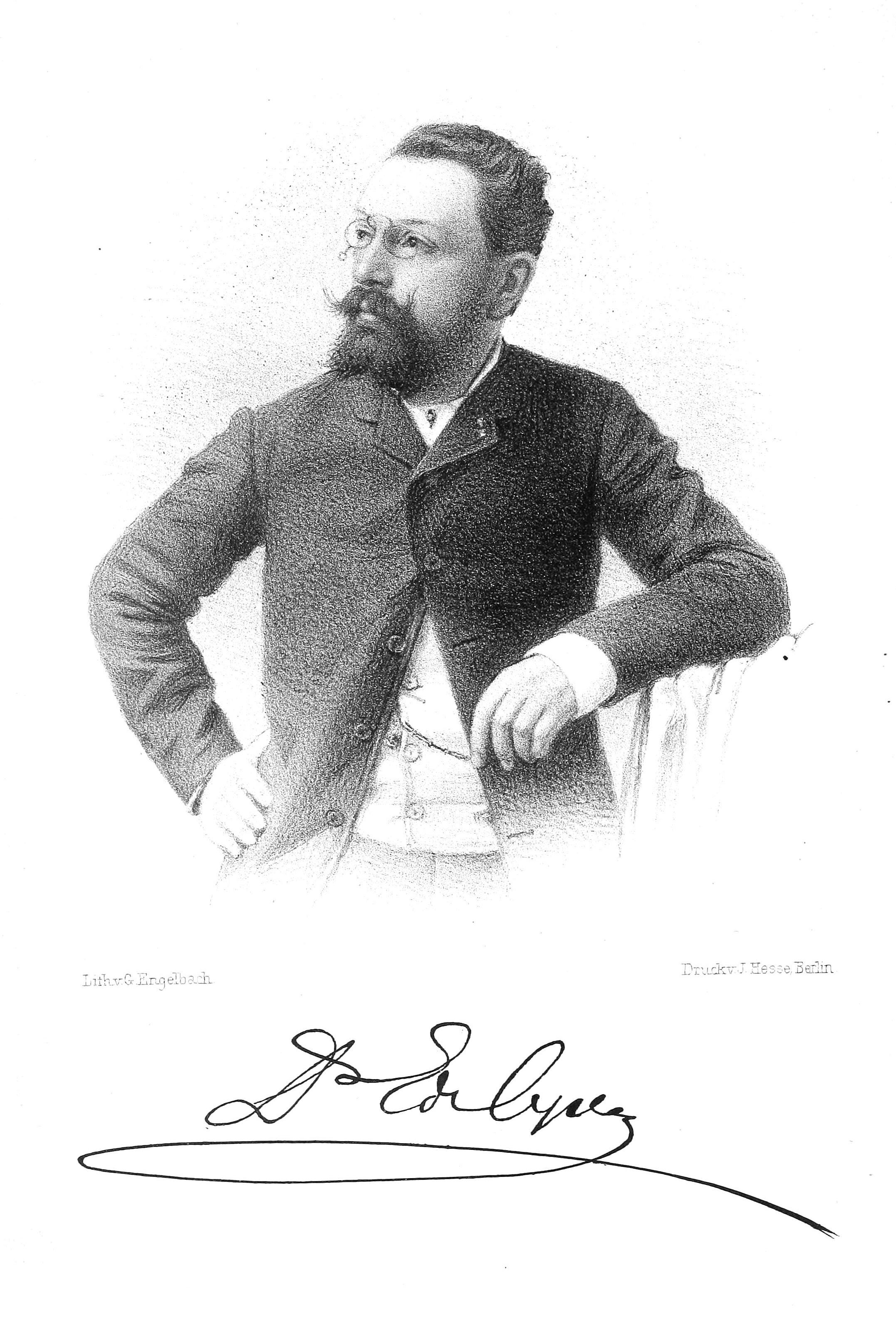
Lithograph of Elias von Cyon, c. 1880

Elias von Cyon, also known in French as Elie de Cyon (born Ilya Faddeyevich Tsion; Russian: Илья Фаддеевич Цион; (Note: His patronymic is also spelled as Faddeich (Фаддеич).) 25 March [O.S. 13 March] 1843 – 5 November 1912), was a Russian and French physiologist. He was born to Jewish parents in Telšiai in the Russian Empire (now in Lithuania). His father was a Cantonist.

== Biography ==
Son of Pinkhos (Faddey) Cyon and his wife Sarah; he had an elder brother Moses (born 1840). Cyon studied medicine at the medical-surgical academy in Warsaw, at the University of Kiev and in Berlin. He obtained a degree in medicine in Kiev in 1864. In 1866, he worked in Leipzig as an assistant to Carl Ludwig (1816–1895), with whom he collaborated on creation of the first isolated perfused frog heart preparation.

From 1867, he taught classes on anatomy and physiology at the University of St. Petersburg, where he was assistant to the director of the physiology laboratory, Filipp Ovsyannikov. At St. Petersburg, one of his students was Ivan Pavlov (1849–1936). In 1870, he became an associate professor, and following student protests concerning his political views, he relocated to Paris in 1877. In Paris, he attained French citizenship and worked with famed physiologist Claude Bernard (1813–1881).

His name is associated with "Cyon's nerve" (aortic nerve), which is a branch of the vagus nerve that terminates in the aortic arch and base of the heart. It is composed entirely of afferent fibers.

He converted to Catholicism in 1908 and is claimed to have written, as part of his antisemitic work, parts of The Protocols of Zion.

== Sources ==
- "Цион, Илья Фаддеич" . Brockhaus and Efron Encyclopedic Dictionary (in Russian). 1906.
