= Sustentacular cell =

Structural and metabolic support cell

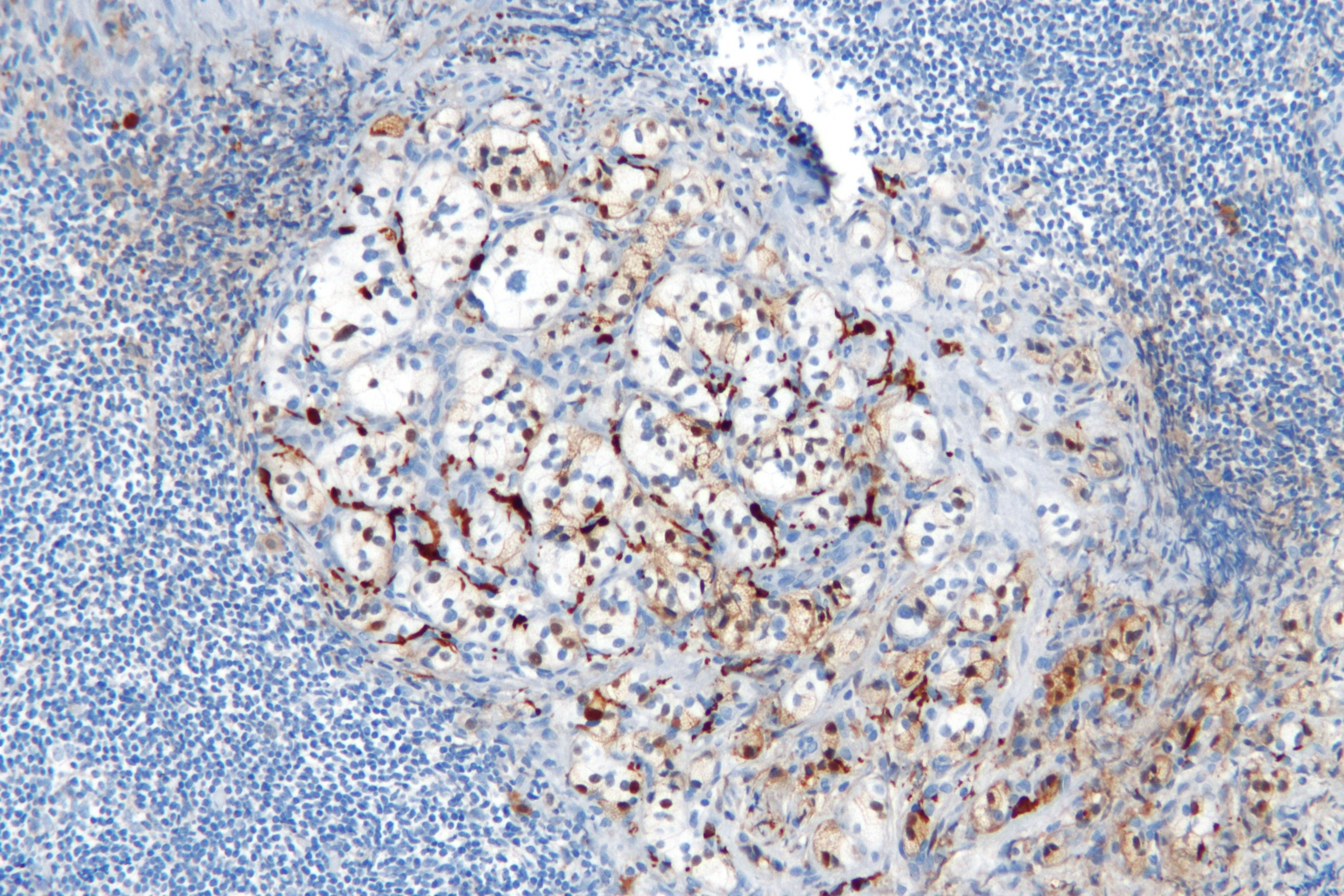
Micrograph highlighting the sustentacular cells in a paraganglioma. S100 immunostain

A sustentacular cell is a type of cell primarily associated with structural support, they can be found in various tissues.

- Sustentacular cells of the olfactory epithelium (also called supporting cells or Sertoli cells) have been shown to be involved in the phagocytosis of dead neurons, odorant transformation and xenobiotic metabolism.
- One type of sustentacular cell is the Sertoli cell, in the testicle. It is located in the walls of the seminiferous tubules and supplies nutrients to sperm. They are responsible for the differentiation of spermatids, the maintenance of the blood-testis barrier, and the secretion of inhibin, androgen-binding protein and Müllerian-inhibiting factor.
- The organ of Corti in the inner ear and taste buds also contain sustentacular cells.
- Another type of sustentacular cell is found with glomus cells of the carotid and aortic bodies.
- About 40% of carcinoids have a scattering of sustentacular cells, which stain positive for S-100.
