= Exhalation =

Flow of the respiratory current out of an organism

Diagram showing expiration

Exhalation (or expiration) is the flow of the breath out of an organism. In animals, it is the movement of air from the lungs out of the airways, to the external environment during breathing. This happens due to elastic properties of the lungs, as well as the internal intercostal muscles which lower the rib cage and decrease thoracic volume. As the thoracic diaphragm relaxes during exhalation it causes the tissue it has depressed to rise superiorly and put pressure on the lungs to expel the air. During forced exhalation, as when blowing out a candle, expiratory muscles including the abdominal muscles and internal intercostal muscles generate abdominal and thoracic pressure, which forces air out of the lungs.

Exhaled air is 4% carbon dioxide, a waste product of cellular respiration during the production of energy, which is stored as ATP. Exhalation has a complementary relationship to inhalation which together make up the respiratory cycle of a breath.

When a person loses weight, the majority of the weight is exhaled as carbon dioxide and water vapor.

== Physiology ==
The main reason for exhalation is to rid the body of carbon dioxide, which is the waste product of gas exchange in humans. Air is brought into the lungs through inhalation. Diffusion in the alveoli allows for the exchange of O_{2} into the pulmonary capillaries and the removal of CO_{2} and other gases from the pulmonary capillaries to be exhaled. In order for the lungs to expel air the diaphragm relaxes, which pushes up on the lungs. The air then flows through the trachea then through the larynx and pharynx to the nasal cavity and oral cavity where it is expelled out of the body. Exhalation takes longer than inhalation and it is believed to facilitate better exchange of gases. Parts of the nervous system help to regulate respiration in humans.

== Composition ==
The exhaled air is not just carbon dioxide; it contains a mixture of other gases. Human breath contains volatile organic compounds (VOCs). These compounds consist of methanol, isoprene, acetone, ethanol and other alcohols. The exhaled mixture also contains ketones, water and other hydrocarbons.

== Smell ==
It is during exhalation that the olfaction contribution to flavor occurs in contrast to that of ordinary smell which occurs during the inhalation phase.

== Spirometry ==
Spirometry is the measure of lung function. The total lung capacity (TLC), functional residual capacity (FRC), residual volume (RV), and vital capacity (VC) are all values that can be tested using this method. Spirometry is used to help detect, but not diagnose, respiratory issues like COPD, and asthma. It is a simple and cost effective screening method. Further evaluation of a person's respiratory function can be done by assessing the minute ventilation, forced vital capacity (FVC), and forced expiratory volume (FEV). These values differ in men and women because men tend to be larger than women.

TLC is the maximum amount of air in the lungs after maximum inhalation. In men the average TLC is 6000 ml, and in women it is 4200 ml. FRC is the amount of air left in the lungs after normal exhalation. Men leave about 2400 ml on average while women retain around 1800 ml. RV is the amount of air left in the lungs after a forced exhalation. The average RV in men is 1200 ml and women 1100 ml. VC is the maximum amount of air that can be exhaled after a maximum inhalation. Men tend to average 4800 ml and women 3100 ml.

Smokers, and those with Asthma and COPD, have reduced airflow ability. People with asthma and COPD show decreases in exhaled air due to inflammation of the airways. This inflammation causes narrowing of the airways which allows less air to be exhaled. Numerous things cause inflammation; some examples are cigarette smoke and environmental interactions such as allergies, weather, and exercise. In smokers the inability to exhale fully is due to the loss of elasticity in the lungs. Smoke in the lungs causes them to harden and become less elastic, which prevents the lungs from expanding or shrinking as they normally would.

Dead space can be determined by two types of factors which are anatomical and physiological. Some physiological factors are having non-perfuse but ventilated alveoli, such as a pulmonary embolism or smoking, excessive ventilation of the alveoli, brought on in relation to perfusion, in people with chronic obstructive lung disease, and "shunt dead space," which is a mistake between the left to right lung that moves the higher CO_{2} concentrations in the venous blood into the arterial side. The anatomical factors are the size of the airway, the valves, and tubing of the respiratory system. Physiological dead space of the lungs can affect the amount of dead space as well with factors including smoking, and diseases. Dead space is a key factor for the lungs to work because of the differences in pressures, but it can also hinder the person.

One of the reasons we can breathe is because of the elasticity of the lungs. The internal surface of the lungs on average in a non-emphysemic person is normally 63m2 and can hold about 5lts of air volume. Both lungs together have the same amount of surface area as half of a tennis court. Disease such as, emphysema, tuberculosis, can reduce the amount of surface area and elasticity of the lungs. Another big factor in the elasticity of the lungs is smoking because of the residue left behind in the lungs from the smoking. The elasticity of the lungs can be trained to expand further.

== Brain involvement ==
Brain control of exhalation can be broken down into voluntary control and involuntary control. During voluntary exhalation, air is held in the lungs and released at a fixed rate. Examples of voluntary expiration include: singing, speaking, exercising, playing an instrument, and voluntary hyperpnea. Involuntary breathing includes metabolic and behavioral breathing.

=== Voluntary expiration ===
The neurological pathway of voluntary exhalation is complex and not fully understood. However, a few basics are known. The motor cortex within the cerebral cortex of the brain is known to control voluntary respiration because the motor cortex controls voluntary muscle movement. This is referred to as the corticospinal pathway or ascending respiratory pathway. The pathway of the electrical signal starts in the motor cortex, goes to the spinal cord, and then to the respiratory muscles. The spinal neurons connect directly to the respiratory muscles. Initiation of voluntary contraction and relaxation of the internal and external internal costals has been shown to take place in the superior portion of the primary motor cortex. Posterior to the location of thoracic control (within the superior portion of the primary motor cortex) is the center for diaphragm control. Studies indicate that there are numerous other sites within the brain that may be associated with voluntary expiration. The inferior portion of the primary motor cortex may be involved, specifically, in controlled exhalation. Activity has also been seen within the supplementary motor area and the premotor cortex during voluntary respiration. This is most likely due to the focus and mental preparation of the voluntary muscular movement.

Voluntary expiration is essential for many types of activities. Phonic respiration (speech generation) is a type of controlled expiration that is used every day. Speech generation is completely dependent on expiration, this can be seen by trying to talk while inhaling. Using airflow from the lungs, one can control the duration, amplitude, and pitch. While the air is expelled it flows through the glottis causing vibrations, which produces sound. Depending on the glottis movement the pitch of the voice changes and the intensity of the air through the glottis change the volume of the sound produced by the glottis.

=== Involuntary expiration ===
Involuntary respiration is controlled by respiratory centers within the medulla oblongata and pons. The medullary respiratory center can be subdivided into anterior and posterior portions. They are called the ventral and dorsal respiratory groups respectively. The pontine respiratory group consists of two parts: the pneumotaxic center and the apneustic center. All four of these centers are located in the brainstem and work together to control involuntary respiration. In our case, the ventral respiratory group (VRG) controls involuntary exhalation.

The neurological pathway for involuntary respiration is called the bulbospinal pathway. It is also referred to as the descending respiratory pathway. "The pathway descends along the spinal ventralateral column. The descending tract for autonomic inspiration is located laterally, and the tract for autonomic expiration is located ventrally." Autonomic Inspiration is controlled by the pontine respiratory center and both medullary respiratory centers. In our case, the VRG controls autonomic exhalation. Signals from the VRG are sent along the spinal cord to several nerves. These nerves include the intercostals, phrenic, and abdominals. These nerves lead to the specific muscles they control. The bulbospinal pathway descending from the VRG allows the respiratory centers to control muscle relaxation, which leads to exhalation.

==== Yawning ====
Yawning is considered a non-respiratory gas movement. A non-respiratory gas movement is another process that moves air in and out of the lungs that do not include breathing. Yawning is a reflex that tends to disrupt the normal breathing rhythm and is believed to be contagious as well. The reason why we yawn is unknown. A common belief is that yawns are a way to regulate the body's levels of O_{2} and CO_{2,} but studies done in a controlled environment with different levels of O_{2} and CO_{2} have disproved that hypothesis. Although there is not a concrete explanation as to why we yawn, others think people exhale as a cooling mechanism for our brains. Studies on animals have supported this idea and it is possible humans could be linked to it as well. What is known is that yawning does ventilate all the alveoli in the lungs.

==== Receptors ====
Several receptor groups in the body regulate metabolic breathing. These receptors signal the respiratory center to initiate inhalation or exhalation. Peripheral chemoreceptors are located in the aorta and carotid arteries. They respond to changing blood levels of oxygen, carbon dioxide, and H^{+} by signaling the pons and medulla. Irritant and stretch receptors in the lungs can directly cause exhalation. Both sense foreign particles and promote spontaneous coughing. They are also known as mechanoreceptors because they recognize physical changes not chemical changes. Central chemoreceptors in the medulla also recognize chemical variations in H^{+}. Specifically, they monitor pH change within the medullary interstitial fluid and cerebral spinal fluid.

== Yoga ==
Yogis such as B. K. S. Iyengar advocate both inhaling and exhaling through the nose in the practice of yoga, rather than inhaling through the nose and exhaling through the mouth. They tell their students that the "nose is for breathing, the mouth is for eating."

== See also ==
- Inhalation
- Obligate nasal breathing
- Mouth breathing
