= Minute ventilation =

Volume of air breathed per minute

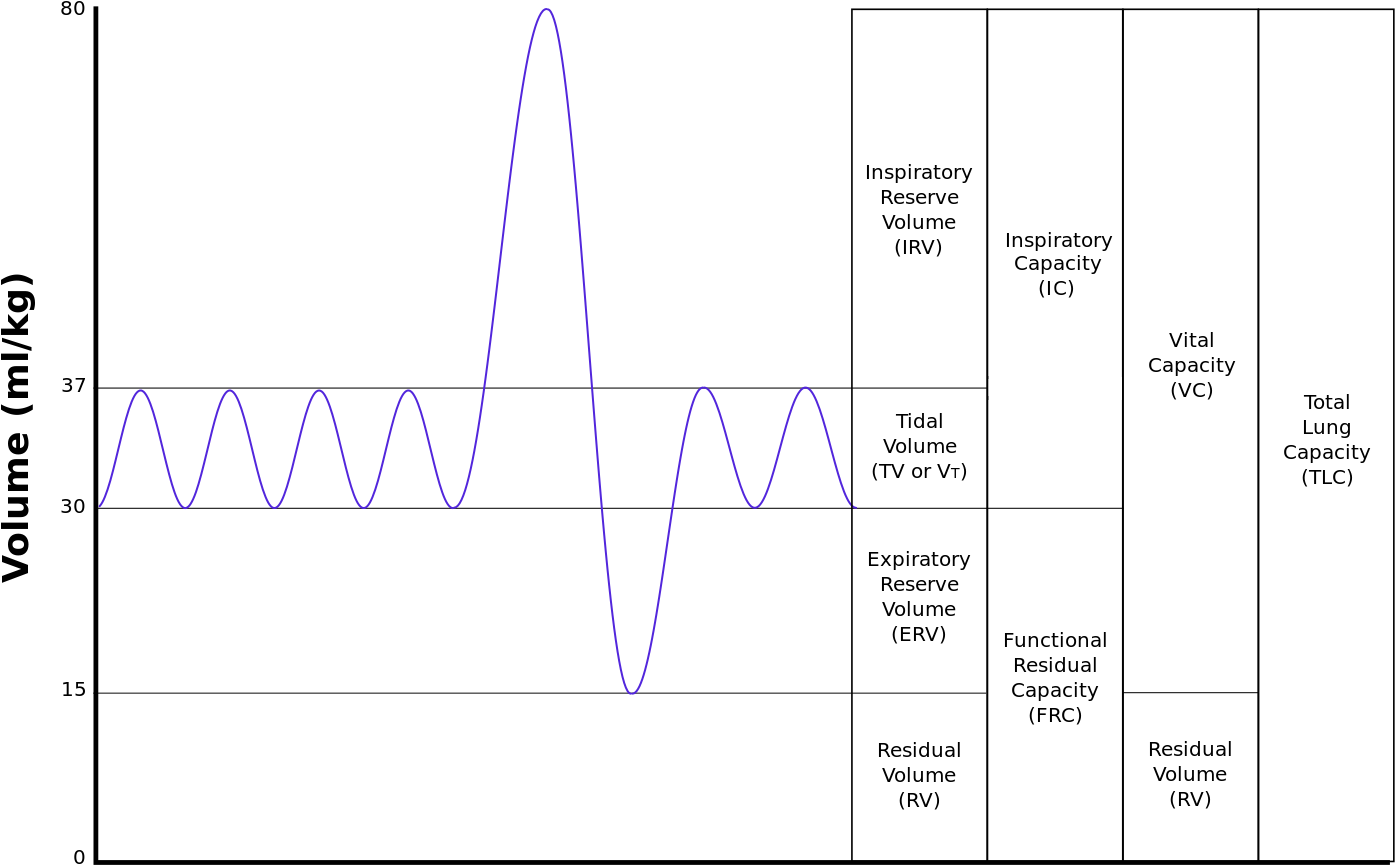
- TLC: Total lung capacity: the volume in the lungs at maximal inflation, the sum of VC and RV.
- TV: Tidal volume: that volume of air moved into or out of the lungs in 1 breath (TV indicates a subdivision of the lung; when tidal volume is precisely measured, as in gas exchange calculation, the symbol TV or V_{T} is used.)
- RV: Residual volume: the volume of air remaining in the lungs after a maximal exhalation
- ERV: Expiratory reserve volume: the maximal volume of air that can be exhaled from the end-expiratory position
- IRV: Inspiratory reserve volume: the maximal volume that can be inhaled from the end-inspiratory level
- IC: Inspiratory capacity: the sum of IRV and TV
- IVC: Inspiratory vital capacity: the maximum volume of air inhaled from the point of maximum expiration
- VC: Vital capacity: the volume of air breathed out after the deepest inhalation.
- V_{T}: Tidal volume: that volume of air moved into or out of the lungs during quiet breathing (VT indicates a subdivision of the lung; when tidal volume is precisely measured, as in gas exchange calculation, the symbol TV or V_{T} is used.)
- FRC: Functional residual capacity: the volume in the lungs at the end-expiratory position
- RV/TLC%: Residual volume expressed as percent of TLC
- V_{A}: Alveolar gas volume
- V_{L}: Actual volume of the lung including the volume of the conducting airway.
- FVC: Forced vital capacity: the determination of the vital capacity from a maximally forced expiratory effort
- FEV_{t}: Forced expiratory volume (time): a generic term indicating the volume of air exhaled under forced conditions in the first t seconds
- FEV_{1}: Volume that has been exhaled at the end of the first second of forced expiration
- FEF_{x}: Forced expiratory flow related to some portion of the FVC curve; modifiers refer to amount of FVC already exhaled
- FEF_{max}: The maximum instantaneous flow achieved during a FVC maneuver
- FIF: Forced inspiratory flow: (Specific measurement of the forced inspiratory curve is denoted by nomenclature analogous to that for the forced expiratory curve. For example, maximum inspiratory flow is denoted FIF_{max}. Unless otherwise specified, volume qualifiers indicate the volume inspired from RV at the point of measurement.)
- PEF: Peak expiratory flow: The highest forced expiratory flow measured with a peak flow meter
- MVV: Maximal voluntary ventilation: volume of air expired in a specified period during repetitive maximal effort

Minute ventilation (or respiratory minute volume or minute volume) is the volume of gas inhaled (inhaled minute volume) or exhaled (exhaled minute volume) from a person's lungs per minute. It is an important parameter in respiratory medicine due to its relationship with blood carbon dioxide levels. It can be measured with devices such as a Wright respirometer or can be calculated from other known respiratory parameters. Although minute volume can be viewed as a unit of volume, it is usually treated in practice as a flow rate (given that it represents a volume change over time). Typical units involved are (in metric) 0.5 L × 12 breaths/min = 6 L/min.

Several symbols can be used to represent minute volume. They include $\dot{V}$ (V̇ or V-dot) or Q (which are general symbols for flow rate), MV, and V_{E}.

== Determination of minute volume ==
Minute volume can either be measured directly or calculated from other known parameters.

=== Measurement of minute volume ===
Minute volume is the amount of gas inhaled or exhaled from a person's lungs in one minute. It can be measured by a Wright respirometer or other device capable of cumulatively measuring gas flow, such as mechanical ventilators.

=== Calculation of minute volume ===
If both tidal volume (V_{T}) and respiratory rate (ƒ or RR) are known, minute volume can be calculated by multiplying the two values. One must also take care to consider the effect of dead space on alveolar ventilation, as seen below in "Relationship to other physiological rates".

$$\dot{V} = V_T \times f$$

== Physiological significance of minute volume ==
Blood carbon dioxide (PaCO_{2}) levels generally vary inversely with minute volume. For example, a person with increased minute volume (e.g. due to hyperventilation) should demonstrate a lower blood carbon dioxide level. The healthy human body will alter minute volume in an attempt to maintain physiologic homeostasis. A normal minute volume while resting is about 5–8 liters per minute in humans. Minute volume generally decreases when at rest, and increases with exercise. For example, during light activities minute volume may be around 12 litres. Riding a bicycle increases minute ventilation by a factor of 2 to 4 depending on the level of exercise involved. Minute ventilation during moderate exercise may be between 40 and 60 litres per minute.

Hyperventilation is the term for having a minute ventilation higher than physiologically appropriate. Hypoventilation describes a minute volume less than physiologically appropriate.

== Relationship to other physiological rates ==
Minute volume comprises the sum of alveolar ventilation and dead space ventilation. That is:

$$\dot{V} = \dot{V}_A + \dot{V}_D$$

where $\dot{V}_A$ is alveolar ventilation, and $\dot{V}_D$ represents dead space ventilation.
