= Cough reflex =

Reflex

The cough reflex occurs when stimulation of cough receptors in the respiratory tract by dust or other foreign particles produces a cough, which causes rapidly moving air which usually remove the foreign material before it reaches the lungs. This typically clears particles from the bronchi and trachea, the tubes that feed air to lung tissue from the nose and mouth. The larynx (voice box) and carina (at the bottom of the trachea, as it splits into bronchi) are especially sensitive. Cough receptors in the surface cells (epithelium) of the respiratory tract are also sensitive to chemicals. Terminal bronchioles and even the alveoli are sensitive to chemicals such as sulfur dioxide gas or chlorine gas.

== Physiology of cough ==
The cough receptors or rapidly adapting irritant receptors are located mainly on the posterior wall of the trachea, larynx, and at the carina of trachea, the point where the trachea branches into the main bronchi. The receptors are less abundant in the distal airways and absent beyond the respiratory bronchioles. When triggered, impulses travel via the internal laryngeal nerve, a branch of the superior laryngeal nerve which stems from the vagus nerve (CN X) to the medulla of the brain. This is the afferent neural pathway. Unlike other areas responsible for involuntary actions like swallowing, there is no definitive area that has been identified as the cough center in the brain.

The efferent neural pathway then follows, with relevant signals transmitted back from the cerebral cortex and medulla via the vagus and superior laryngeal nerves to the glottis, external intercostals, diaphragm, and other major inspiratory and expiratory muscles. The mechanism of a cough is as follows:

- Diaphragm (innervated by phrenic nerve) and external intercostal muscles (innervated by segmental intercostal nerves) contract, creating a negative pressure around the lung.
- Air rushes into the lungs in order to equalise the pressure.
- The glottis closes (muscles innervated by recurrent laryngeal nerve) and the vocal cords contract to shut the larynx.
- The abdominal muscles contract to accentuate the action of the relaxing diaphragm; simultaneously, the other expiratory muscles contract. These actions increase the pressure of air within the lungs.
- The vocal cords relax and the glottis opens, releasing air at over 100 mph.
- The bronchi and non-cartilaginous portions of the trachea collapse to form slits through which the air is forced, which clears out any irritants attached to the respiratory lining.

Stimulation of the auricular branch of the vagus nerve supplying the ear may also elicit a cough. This ear-cough reflex is also known as Arnold's nerve reflex (ANR), linked to the auricular branch of vagus nerve. It is an example of vagal hypersensitivity. Weakness of the respiratory muscles, tracheostomy, or vocal cord pathology (including paralysis or anesthesia) may prevent effective clearing of the airways.

== Dysfunction ==
The reflex is impaired in the person whose abdominals and respiratory muscles are weak. This problem can be caused by disease conditions that lead to muscle weakness or paralysis, by prolonged inactivity, or as outcome of surgery involving these muscles. Bed rest interferes with the expansion of the chest and limits the amount of air that can be taken into the lungs in preparation for coughing, making the cough weak and ineffective. This reflex may also be impaired by damage to the internal branch of the superior laryngeal nerve which relays the afferent branch of the reflex arc. This nerve is most commonly damaged by swallowing a foreign object, such as a chicken bone, resulting in it being lodged in the piriform recess (in the laryngopharynx) or by surgical removal of said object.

== Testing ==
The cough reflex as a result of irritants, can be tested by inhaling air with nebulized 200 μmol/L capsaicin.

== See also ==
- Cough
