= Hans Paul Bernhard Gierke =

German anatomist (1847–1886)

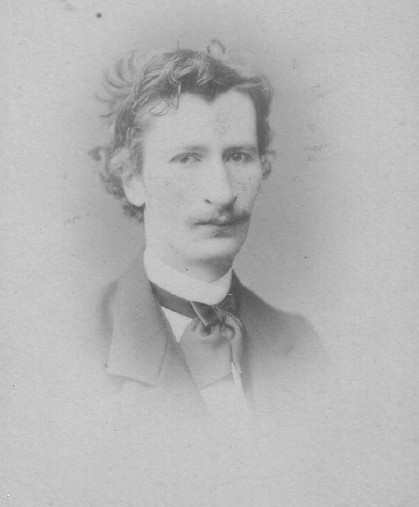
Hans Paul Bernhard Gierke

Hans Paul Bernhard Gierke (19 August 1847 – 8 May 1886) was a German anatomist who was a native of Stettin.

== Biography ==
Gierke studied medicine in Berlin, Vienna, Leipzig, Würzburg, Breslau and Munich, graduating in Würzburg, where he obtained his doctorate in 1872. In 1874 he became prosector at Würzburg, where his teacher was Albert von Kölliker. In 1876 he was appointed professor of anatomy at the Imperial University of Tokyo. For health reasons he had to give up his academic career and return to Germany. In 1881 he became an assistant in the Physiological Institute in Breslau and in 1882 attained the title of professor extraordinarius. In 1883 he visited the Zoological Station in Naples. His health deteriorated rapidly. Soon, he died in the psychiatric hospital in Schöneberg near Berlin, at the age of 39.

== Legacy ==
He is best remembered for his research on staining methods in neurohistology and the localization of the respiratory center. The solitary tract in the brain stem is sometimes called the "Gierke respiratory bundle".

== Works ==
- Die Theile der Medulla oblongata, deren Verletzung die Athembewegungen hemmt, und das Athemcentrum. Archiv für die gesammte Physiologie des Menschen und der Thiere 7, pp. 583–600, 1873 doi:10.1007/BF01613350
- Beiträge zur Kenntniss der Elemente des centralen Nervensystems. Breslauer ärztliche Zeitschrift 4, pp. 157; 172, 1882
- Die Stützsubstanz des centralen Nervensystems. Neurologisches Centralblatt 2 (16, 17), pp. 361–369; 385-392, 1883
- Japanische Malerei. Westermanns Monatshefte 54, pp. 202–219, 324-340, 1883
- Ueber die Medicin in Japan in alten und neuen Zeiten. Breslauer ärztliche Zeitschrift pp. 64; 139, 1882
- Ueber die Medicin in Japan in alten und neuen Zeiten. Deutsches Archiv für Geschichte der Medicin und Medicinische Geographie 7, pp. 1–15, 1884
- Ueber die Medicin in Japan in alten und neuen Zeiten. Jahres-Bericht der Schlesischen Gesellschaft für Vaterländische Cultur 60, pp. 18–30, 1882/1883
- Die Zoologische Station in Neapel. T. Fischer, 1884
- Färberei zu mikroskopischen Zwecken. Zeitschrift für wissenschaftliche Mikroskopie und für mikroskopische Technik 1, 62-100; 372-408; 497-557, 2, 13-36; 164-221, 1885
- Zur Frage des Atmungscentrums. Centralblatt für die medicinischen Wissenschaften 23, pp. 593–596, 1885
- Staining Tissues in Microscopy. American Monthly Microscopical Journal 6, 13; 31; 52; 70; 97; 150, 1886
- Die Stützsubstanz des Centralnervensystems. Archiv für Mikroskopische Anatomie 25, 1, 441-554, 1885 doi:10.1007/BF02966381 26, 1, pp. 129–228 doi:10.1007/BF02954585
