= Aortic body =

Cell cluster in the aorta which monitors blood content

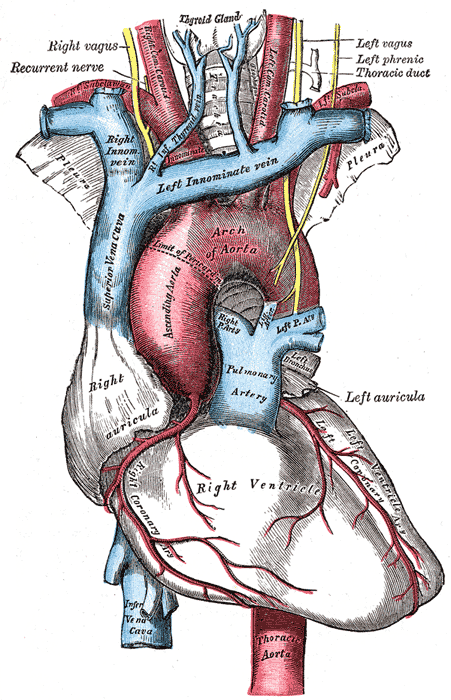
- The heart, thoracic aorta and other great vessels (aortic body not visible, but aortic arch labeled at center)

Details
- Nerve: Vagus nerve

Identifiers
- Latin: Glomus aorticum, corpora paraaortica
- MeSH: D001016

The aortic bodies are one of several small clusters of peripheral chemoreceptors located along the aortic arch. They are important in measuring partial pressures of oxygen and carbon dioxide in the blood, and blood pH.

== Structure ==
The aortic bodies are collections of chemoreceptors present on the aortic arch. Most are located above the aortic arch, while some are located on the posterior side of the aortic arch between it and the pulmonary artery below. They consist of glomus cells and sustentacular cells.

Some sources equate the "aortic bodies" and "paraaortic bodies", while other sources explicitly distinguish between the two. When a distinction is made, the "aortic bodies" are chemoreceptors which regulate the circulatory system, while the "paraaortic bodies" are the chromaffin cells which manufacture catecholamines.

== Function ==
The aortic bodies measure partial gas pressures and the composition of arterial blood flowing past it. These changes may include:

- oxygen partial pressure.
- carbon dioxide partial pressure.
- pH (indirectly affected by carbon dioxide concentration).

They are particularly sensitive to changes in pH. Aortic bodies are more sensitive detectors of total arterial blood oxygen content than the carotid body chemoreceptors, which are more sensitive detectors of the partial pressure of oxygen in the arterial blood.

The aortic bodies give feedback to the medulla oblongata, specifically to the dorsal respiratory group, via the afferent branches of the vagus nerve (cranial nerve X). The medulla oblongata, in turn, regulates breathing and blood pressure.

== Clinical significance ==
A paraganglioma, also known as a chemodectoma or carotid body paraganglioma, is a tumor involving an aortic body.

It has been hypothesized that inflammatory responses involving the aortic body play a role in the development of intractable and severe apnea known to occur in a subset of premature infants.

== See also ==
- Carotid body
- Control of respiration
- Peripheral chemoreceptors
