= Central chemoreceptor =

Respiratory sensory receptors

Central chemoreceptors are chemoreceptors beneath the ventral surface of the medulla oblongata which are highly sensitive to pH changes of nearby cerebrospinal fluid (CSF). The functional significance of the receptors is indirect monitoring of blood levels of CO_{2}, thus providing an important parameter for the regulation of ventilation to the nearby respiratory center. Central chemoreceptors are the primary generator of regulatory feedback information for respiration while blood gas levels are around normal.

Peripheral chemoreceptors meanwhile also directly monitor blood O_{2}.

== Anatomy ==
Central chemoreceptors are located in the so-called chemosensitive area, a bilateral region of the ventrolateral medulla oblongata situated 0.2 mm beneath the ventral surface of the medulla, near the origins of cranial nerves IX and X from the brain. The chemoreceptors relay sensory information to the respiratory center.

== Physiology ==
=== Biochemical mechanism ===
It is thought that H^{+} may be the only direct stimulus detected by the receptors; the receptors are thought to sense the concentration of CO_{2} indirectly by detecting H^{+} formed as it reacts with water to form carbonic acid which in turn dissociates to form H^{+} and HCO_{3}^{−}. However, because the gaseous CO_{2} from blood far more readily diffuses across the blood–brain barrier to reach the medullary interstitial fluid than H^{+} ions, the chemoreceptors are far more responsive to blood CO_{2} concentration changes than to H^{+} concentration changes.

=== Role in regulation of respiration ===
Blood CO_{2} is the primary parameter for biological regulation of respiration because its concentration is inversely related to pulmonary ventilation; blood O_{2} concentration is meanwhile normally adequate for tissue perfusion across a wide range of ventilatory circumstances (from below 50% of normal to over 2,000% of normal) and is therefore requires less stringent control.

==== Factors influencing ventilatory response to CO_{2} ====
- Within days, the set point of the respiratory center can gradually readjust to tolerate as much as 80% lower CO_{2}/H^{+} concentrations. This way, sub-optimum O_{2} blood concentration can become the driving stimulus for increased ventilation without an overriding inhibitory effect of reduced CO_{2} concentrations. Acute exposure to hypoxia produces a 70% increase in ventilation, whereas after adaptation to reduced CO_{2} concentration, the same stimulus can produce a 400%-500% increase in ventilation. This is one of the mechanisms underlying acclimatization to higher altitudes, and in part explains why mountain climbers should ascend gradually.
- Reduced arterial CO_{2} pressure significantly attenuates the ventilatory drive. For example, a bout of voluntary hyperventilation appreciably attenuates the ventilatory drive for a short period; some swimmers or sprinters intentionally hyperventilate just prior to the start of the race to suppress the urge to breathe during the race. Accidental medical overventilation of an anaesthesized patient may cause the patient to cease breathing for about a minute.
- Trained athletes and divers tend to acquire an attenuated sensitivity to lowered arterial CO_{2} concentration.
- Increased work of breathing (this can be demonstrated experimentally by breathing through a narrow tube). This may partially explain the reduced CO_{2} response observed in some patients with lung disease; in such individuals, administration of bronchodilators (which reduce airway resistance) increase the response.
- Sleep
- Increased age
- Genetics
- Gersonality

== See also ==
- Chemoreceptors
- Vasomotor center
