= Solitary nucleus =

Sensory nuclei in medulla oblongata

- The cranial nerve nuclei schematically represented; dorsal view. Motor nuclei in red; sensory in blue.

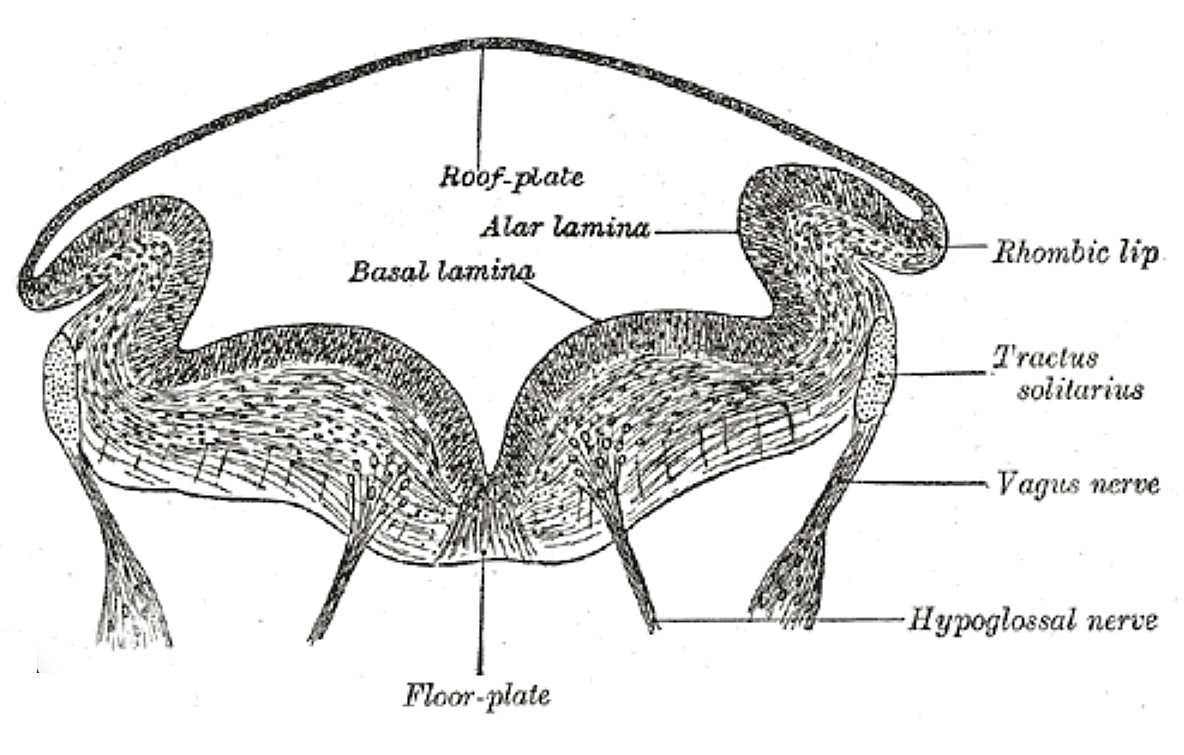
- Transverse section of medulla oblongata of human embryo.

Details

Identifiers
- Latin: nucleus tractus solitarii medullae oblongatae
- MeSH: D017552
- NeuroNames: 742
- NeuroLex ID: birnlex_1429
- TA98: A14.1.04.230
- TA2: 6008
- FMA: 72242

The solitary nucleus (SN) (nucleus of the solitary tract, nucleus solitarius, or nucleus tractus solitarii) is a series of neurons whose cell bodies form a roughly vertical column of grey matter in the medulla oblongata of the brainstem. Their axons form the bulk of the enclosed solitary tract. The solitary nucleus can be divided into different parts including dorsomedial, dorsolateral, and ventrolateral subnuclei.

The solitary nucleus receives general visceral and special visceral inputs from the facial nerve (CN VII), glossopharyngeal nerve (CN IX) and vagus nerve (CN X); it receives and relays stimuli related to taste and visceral sensation. It sends outputs to various parts of the brain, such as the hypothalamus, thalamus, and reticular formation, forming circuits that contribute to autonomic regulation.

Cells along the length of the SN are arranged roughly in accordance with function; for instance, cells involved in taste are located in the rostral part, while those receiving information from cardio-respiratory and gastrointestinal processes are found in the caudal part. The cells involved in taste are the part of the solitary nucleus referred to as the gustatory nucleus.

== Anatomy ==
The solitary nucleus is a series of neurons in the medulla oblongata. Their cell bodies form a roughly vertical column of grey matter in the medulla oblongata. Their axons form an enclosed nerve tract called the solitary tract.

=== Viscerotopic organization ===
Neurons of the SN are notably functionally arranged roughly length-wise along the nucleus: gustatory neurons are situated rostrally (with afferents from the anterior part of the tongue and roof of oral cavity rostral-most, and those from the larynx and epiglottis more caudally placed); gastrointestinal, cardiovascular, respiratory neurons are situated more caudally. However, some localization/organization also occurs along the ventro-dorsal and medio-lateral axes.

=== Afferents ===
- Gustatory (taste) sensation from facial nerve (CN VII) via the chorda tympani (from anterior 2/3 of tongue), glossopharyngeal nerve (CN IX) (from posterior 1/3 of tongue), and vagus nerve (CN X) (from epiglottis).
- Chemoreceptors and mechanoreceptors of the general visceral afferent pathway (GVA) from the carotid body and carotid sinus via (the carotid sinus nerve of) CN IX; from aortic bodies and aortic arch via CN X.
- Chemoreceptors and mechanoreceptors of the general visceral afferent pathway (GVA) with endings located in the heart, lungs, airways, gastrointestinal system, pharynx, and liver via the glossopharyngeal and vagus nerves. Organ specific regions of neuronal architecture are preserved in the solitary nucleus. Additional minor GVA input from the nasal cavity, soft palate and sinus cavities enters via the facial nerve.

Non-sensory afferent projections include:

- medial zone of hypothalamus → dorsal longitudinal fasciculus → periaqueductal gray → autonomic input of solitary nucleus

=== Efferents ===
The solitary nucleus projects to numerous regions of the CNS, including:

- thalamus (mediates autonomic responses, conscious taste sensation, conscious visceral sensations like stomach fullness/emptiness)
  - (medial-most portion of) ventral posteromedial nucleus of thalamus → (via third-order neuron) sensory cortex and insular cortex
- paraventricular nucleus of hypothalamus → limbic system (mediates autonomic responses)
- reticular formation (mediates autonomic responses)
- parasympathetic preganglionic neurons (for autonomic responses)
- central nucleus of the amygdala
- parabrachial area
- locus coeruleus
- dorsal raphe nucleus
- solitariospinal tract → upper levels of spinal cord
- other visceral motor or respiratory centers

The SN projects to multiple other cranial nerve nuclei:

- salivatory nuclei
- hypoglossal nucleus
- dorsal nucleus of vagus nerve
- nucleus ambiguus (to mediate gag reflex)

== Function ==
Afferents of the SN mediate the gag reflex, the carotid sinus reflex, the aortic reflex, the cough reflex, the baroreflex and chemoreceptor reflexes, several respiratory reflexes, the belch reflex, and other reflexes within the gastrointestinal system that regulate motility and secretion.

Neurons which transmit signals about the gut wall, the stretch of the lungs, and the dryness of mucous membranes also innervate the SN. The first central neurons within the SN can participate in simple autonomic reflexes.

=== Gag reflex arc ===
The afferent limb of the gag reflex arc is conveyed by sensory afferents of the CN IX which terminate in the SN; the SN then projects to the nucleus ambiguus which in turn gives rise to motor efferent fibers of the CN IX/X which then mediate the efferent limb of the arc.

== Additional images ==
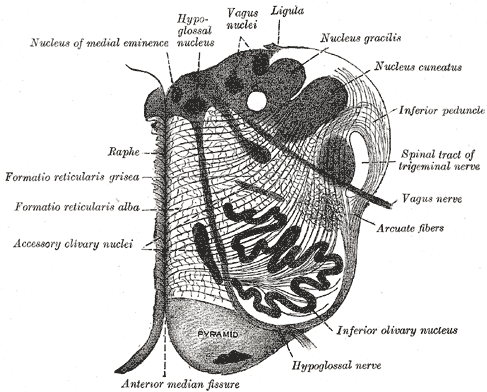
Section of the medulla oblongata at about the middle of the olive.

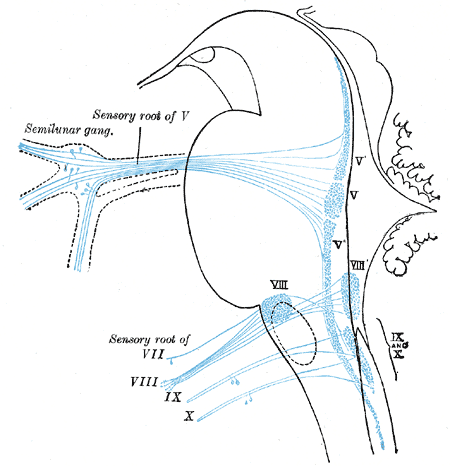
Primary terminal nuclei of the afferent (sensory) cranial nerves schematically represented; lateral view.
