= Solitary tract =

Fibre bundle at the base of the brain

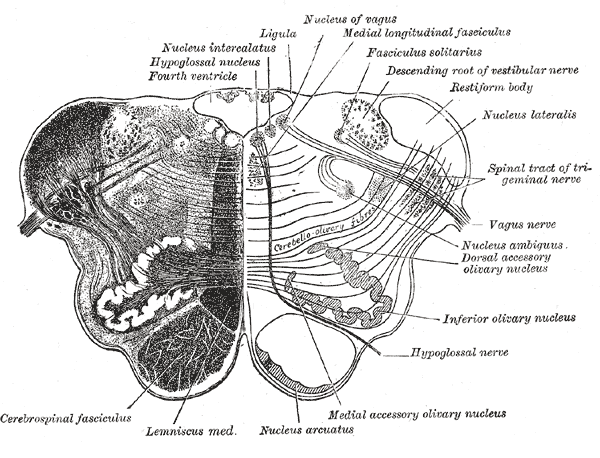
- Transverse section of medulla oblongata below the middle of the olive. (Fasciculus solitarius labeled at upper right.)

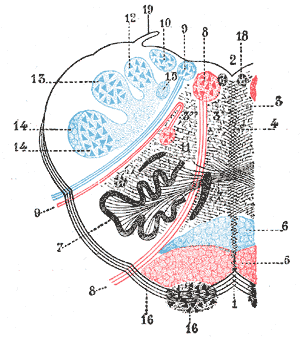
- The formatio reticularis of the medulla oblongata, shown by a transverse section passing through the middle of the olive. (#15 is fasciculus solitarius)

Details

Identifiers
- Latin: tractus solitarius medullae oblongatae
- NeuroNames: 785
- NeuroLex ID: birnlex_1483
- TA98: A14.1.04.120
- TA2: 6048
- FMA: 72618

The solitary tract (tractus solitarius or fasciculus solitarius) is a compact fiber bundle that extends longitudinally through the posterolateral region of the medulla oblongata. The solitary tract is surrounded by the solitary nucleus, and descends to the upper cervical segments of the spinal cord. It was first named by Theodor Meynert in 1872.

== Composition ==
The solitary tract is made up of primary sensory fibers and descending fibers of the vagus, glossopharyngeal, and facial nerves.

== Function ==
The solitary tract conveys afferent information from stretch receptors and chemoreceptors in the walls of the cardiovascular, respiratory, and intestinal tracts. Afferent fibers from cranial nerves 7, 9 and 10 convey taste (SVA) in its rostral portion, and general visceral sense (general visceral afferent fibers, GVA) in its caudal part. Taste buds in the mucosa of the tongue can also generate impulses in the rostral regions of the solitary tract. The efferent fibers are distributed to the solitary tract nucleus.

== Synonyms ==
There are numerous synonyms for the solitary tract:

- round fasciculus (Latin: fasciculus rotundus)
- solitary fasciculus (Latin: fasciculus solitarius)
- solitary bundle (Latin: funiculus solitarius)
- Gierke respiratory bundle (Named for German anatomist Hans Paul Bernhard Gierke).
- Krause respiratory bundle (Named for German anatomist Johann Friedrich Wilhelm Krause).
