= Carotid sinus nerve =

Branch of glossopharyngeal nerve to carotid sinus
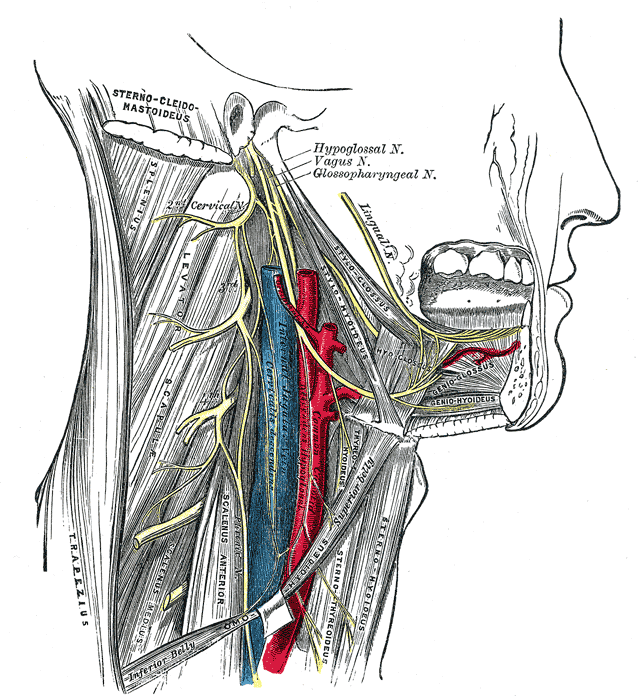
- Hypoglossal nerve, cervical plexus and their branches (nerve not labeled, but region is visible)

Details
- From: Glossopharyngeal nerve

Identifiers
- Latin: ramus sinus carotici nervi glossopharyngei
- TA98: A14.2.01.146
- TA2: 6327
- FMA: 53488

The carotid branch of the glossopharyngeal nerve (carotid sinus nerve or Hering's nerve) is a small branch of the glossopharyngeal nerve (cranial nerve IX) that innervates the carotid sinus, and carotid body.

== Anatomy ==
=== Course and relations ===
It runs downward anterior to the internal carotid artery. It communicates with the vagus nerve and sympathetic trunk before dividing in the angle of the bifurcation of the common carotid artery to innervate the carotid body, and carotid sinus.

== Function ==
It conveys information from the baroreceptors of the carotid sinus to the vasomotor center in the brainstem (in order to mediate blood pressure homeostasis), and from chemoreceptors of the carotid body (mainly conveying information about partial pressures of blood oxygen, and carbon dioxide).
