= Baroreflex =

Homeostatic mechanism in the body

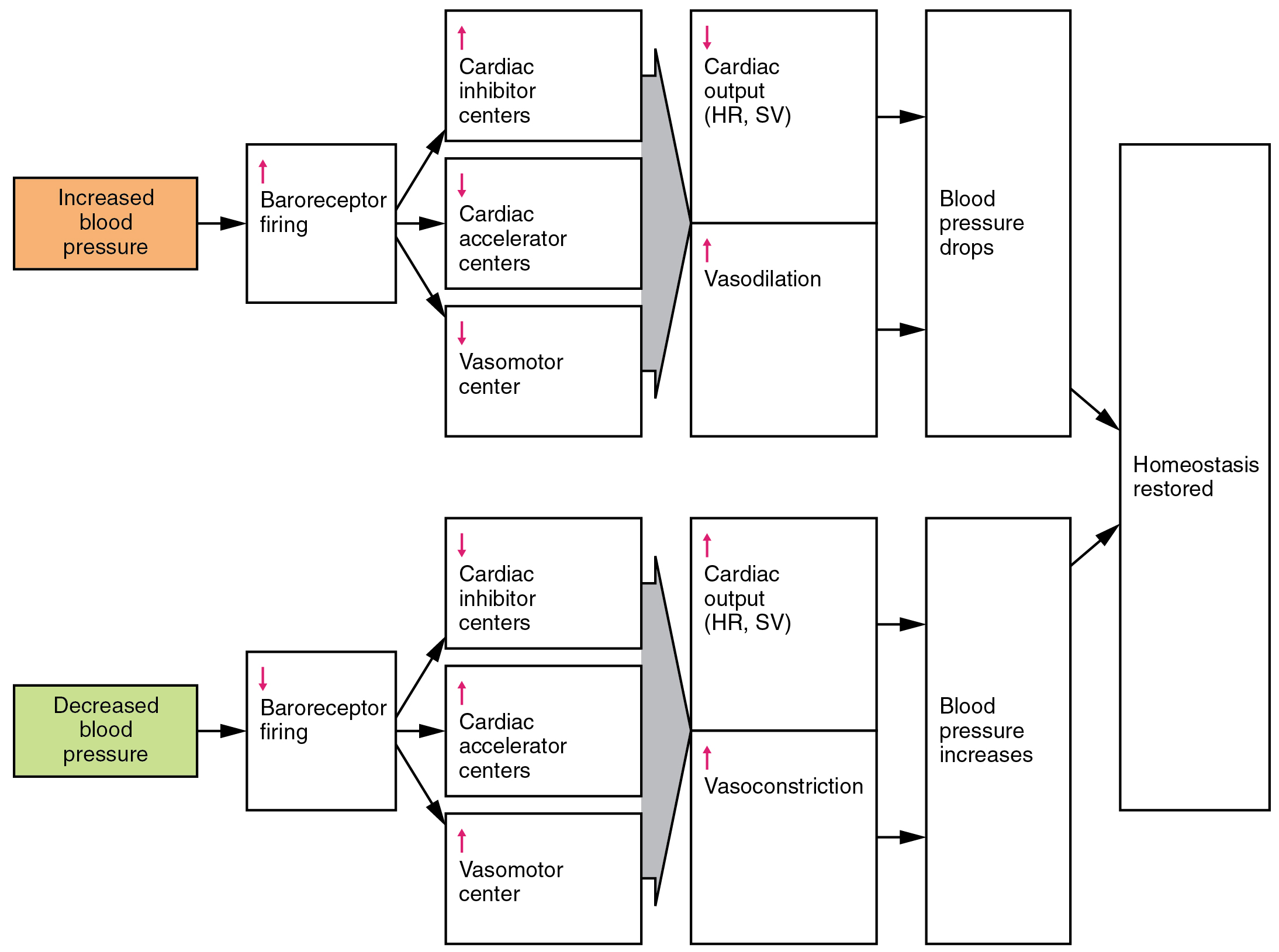
Flowchart showing baroreceptor reflex

The baroreflex or baroreceptor reflex is one of the body's homeostatic mechanisms that helps to maintain blood pressure at nearly constant levels. The baroreflex provides a rapid negative feedback loop in which an elevated blood pressure causes the heart rate to decrease. Decreased blood pressure decreases baroreflex activation and causes heart rate to increase and to restore blood pressure levels. Their function is to sense pressure changes by responding to change in the tension of the arterial wall. The baroreflex can begin to act in less than the duration of a cardiac cycle (fractions of a second) and thus baroreflex adjustments are key factors in dealing with postural hypotension, the tendency for blood pressure to decrease on standing due to gravity.

The system relies on specialized neurons, known as baroreceptors, chiefly in the aortic arch and carotid sinuses, to monitor changes in blood pressure and relay them to the medulla oblongata. Baroreceptors are stretch receptors and respond to the pressure induced stretching of the blood vessel in which they are found. Baroreflex-induced changes in blood pressure are mediated by both branches of the autonomic nervous system: the parasympathetic and sympathetic nerves. Baroreceptors are active even at normal blood pressures so their activity informs the brain about both increases and decreases in blood pressure.

The body contains two other, slower-acting systems to regulate blood pressure: the heart releases atrial natriuretic peptide when blood pressure is too high, and the kidneys sense and correct low blood pressure with the renin–angiotensin system.

== Anatomy ==
Baroreceptors are present in the atria of the heart and venae cavae, but the most sensitive baroreceptors are in the carotid sinuses and aortic arch. While the carotid sinus baroreceptor axons travel within the glossopharyngeal nerve (CN IX), the aortic arch baroreceptor axons travel within the vagus nerve (CN X). Baroreceptor activity travels along these nerves directly into the central nervous system to excite glutamatergic neurons within the solitary nucleus (SN) in the brainstem. Baroreceptor information flows from the SN neurons to both parasympathetic and sympathetic neurons within the brainstem.

The SN neurons send excitatory fibers (glutamatergic) to the caudal ventrolateral medulla (CVLM), activating the CVLM. The activated CVLM then sends inhibitory fibers (GABAergic) to the rostral ventrolateral medulla (RVLM), thus inhibiting the RVLM. The RVLM is the primary regulator of the sympathetic nervous system, sending excitatory fibers (glutamatergic) to the sympathetic preganglionic neurons located in the intermediolateral nucleus of the spinal cord. Hence, when the baroreceptors are activated (by an increased blood pressure), the solitary nucleus activates the CVLM, which in turn inhibits the RVLM, thus decreasing the activity of the sympathetic branch of the autonomic nervous system, leading to a relative decrease in blood pressure. Conversely, low blood pressure activates baroreceptors less and causes an increase in sympathetic tone via "disinhibition" (less inhibition, hence activation) of the RVLM. Cardiovascular targets of the sympathetic nervous system includes both blood vessels and the heart.

Even at resting levels of blood pressure, arterial baroreceptor discharge activates SN neurons. Some of these SN neurons are tonically activated by this resting blood pressure and thus activate excitatory fibers to the nucleus ambiguus and dorsal nucleus of vagus nerve to regulate the parasympathetic nervous system. These parasympathetic neurons send axons to the heart and parasympathetic activity slows cardiac pacemaking and thus heart rate. This parasympathetic activity is further increased during conditions of elevated blood pressure. The parasympathetic nervous system is primarily directed toward the heart.

== Activation ==
The baroreceptors are stretch-sensitive mechanoreceptors. At low pressures, baroreceptors become inactive. When blood pressure rises, the carotid and aortic sinuses are distended further, resulting in increased stretch and, therefore, a greater degree of activation of the baroreceptors. At normal resting blood pressures, many baroreceptors are actively reporting blood pressure information and the baroreflex is actively modulating autonomic activity. Active baroreceptors fire action potentials ("spikes") more frequently. The greater the stretch the more rapidly baroreceptors fire action potentials. Many individual baroreceptors are inactive at normal resting pressures and only become activated when their stretch or pressure threshold is exceeded.

Baroreceptor mechanosensitivity is hypothesised to be linked to the expression of PIEZO1 and PIEZO2 on neurons in the petrosal and nodose ganglia.

Baroreceptor action potentials are relayed to the solitary nucleus, which uses frequency as a measure of blood pressure. Increased activation of the solitary nucleus inhibits the vasomotor center and stimulates the vagal nuclei. The end-result of baroreceptor activation is inhibition of the sympathetic nervous system and activation of the parasympathetic nervous system.

The sympathetic and parasympathetic branches of the autonomic nervous system have opposing effects on blood pressure. Sympathetic activation leads to an elevation of total peripheral resistance and cardiac output via increased contractility of the heart, heart rate, and arterial vasoconstriction, which tends to increase blood pressure. Conversely, parasympathetic activation leads to decreased cardiac output via decrease in heart rate, resulting in a tendency to lower blood pressure.

By coupling sympathetic inhibition and parasympathetic activation, the baroreflex maximizes blood pressure reduction. Sympathetic inhibition leads to a drop in peripheral resistance, while parasympathetic activation leads to a depressed heart rate (reflex bradycardia) and contractility. The combined effects will dramatically decrease blood pressure. In a similar manner, sympathetic activation with parasympathetic inhibition allows the baroreflex to elevate blood pressure.

== Set point and tonic activation ==
Baroreceptor firing has an inhibitory effect on sympathetic outflow. The sympathetic neurons fire at different rates which determines the release of norepinephrine onto cardiovascular targets. Norepinephrine constricts blood vessels to increase blood pressure. When baroreceptors are stretched (due to an increased blood pressure) their firing rate increases which in turn decreases the sympathetic outflow resulting in reduced norepinephrine and thus blood pressure. When the blood pressure is low, baroreceptor firing is reduced and this in turn results in augmented sympathetic outflow and increased norepinephrine release on the heart and blood vessels, increasing blood pressure.

== Effect on heart rate variability ==
The baroreflex may be responsible for a part of the low-frequency component of heart rate variability, the so-called Mayer waves, at 0.1 Hz.

== Baroreflex activation therapy ==
Baroreflex activation is distinct from vagal stimulation. It works through an afferent limb which has the double effect of stimulating vagal outflow and attenuating global sympathetic outflow.

=== High blood pressure ===
The baroreflex can be used to treat resistant hypertension. This stimulation is provided by a pacemaker-like device. While the devices appears to lower blood pressure, evidence remains very limited as of 2018.

=== Heart failure ===
The ability of baroreflex activation therapy to reduce sympathetic nerve activity suggests a potential in the treatment of chronic heart failure, because in this condition there is often intense sympathetic activation and patients with such sympathetic activation show a markedly increased risk of fatal arrhythmias and death.

One trial has already shown that baroreflex activation therapy improves functional status, quality of life, exercise capacity and N-terminal pro-brain natriuretic peptide.

== See also ==
- Heart rate turbulence
- Valsalva maneuver
- Low pressure receptor
- High pressure receptor
- Atrial natriuretic peptide: When the atrium stretches, blood pressure is considered to be increased and sodium is excreted to lower blood pressure.
- Renin-angiotensin system: When the blood flow through the juxtaglomerular apparatus decreases, blood pressure is considered low, and the adrenal cortex secretes aldosterone to increase sodium reabsorption in the collecting duct, thereby increasing blood pressure.
- Bainbridge reflex: In response to stretching of the right atrium wall, heart rate increases, lowering venous blood pressure.
- Antidiuretic hormone: The hypothalamus detects the extracellular fluid hyperosmolality and the posterior pituitary gland secretes antidiuretic hormone to increase water reabsorption in the collecting duct.
