= High pressure receptors =

Type of pressure-sensing cells

High pressure receptors or high pressure baroreceptors are the baroreceptors found within the aortic arch and carotid sinus. They are only sensitive to blood pressures above 60 mmHg.

When these receptors are activated they elicit a depressor response; which decreases the heart rate and causes a general vasodilation. An increase in arterial blood pressure reflexively elicits an increase in vagal neuronal activity to the heart (i.e. the resulting decreased heart rate).

The afferent nerves from the baroreceptors are called buffer nerves.

== See also ==
- Low pressure receptors
- Bainbridge reflex
