= Reflex bradycardia =

Decrease in heart rate

Reflex bradycardia is a bradycardia (decrease in heart rate) in response to the baroreceptor reflex, one of the body's homeostatic mechanisms for preventing abnormal increases in blood pressure. In the presence of high mean arterial pressure, the baroreceptor reflex produces a reflex bradycardia as a method of decreasing blood pressure by decreasing cardiac output.

Blood pressure (BP) is determined by cardiac output (CO) and total peripheral resistance (TPR), as represented by the formula BP = CO × TPR. Cardiac output (CO) is affected by two factors, the heart rate (HR) and the stroke volume (SV), the volume of blood pumped from one ventricle of the heart with each beat (CO = HR × SV, therefore BP = HR × SV × TPR). In reflex bradycardia, blood pressure is reduced by decreasing cardiac output (CO) via a decrease in heart rate (HR).

An increase in blood pressure can be caused by increased cardiac output, increased total peripheral resistance, or both. The baroreceptors in the carotid sinus sense this increase in blood pressure and relay the information to the cardiovascular centres in the medulla oblongata. In order to maintain homeostasis, the cardiovascular centres activate the parasympathetic nervous system. Via the vagus nerve, the parasympathetic nervous system stimulates neurons that release the neurotransmitter acetylcholine (ACh) at synapses with cardiac muscle cells. Acetylcholine then binds to M_{2} muscarinic receptors, causing the decrease in heart rate that is referred to as reflex bradycardia.

The M_{2} muscarinic receptors decrease the heart rate by inhibiting depolarization of the sinoatrial node via G_{i} protein-coupled receptors and through modulation of muscarinic potassium channels. Additionally, M_{2} receptors reduce the contractile forces of the atrial cardiac muscle and reduce the conduction velocity of the atrioventricular node (AV node). However, M_{2} receptors have no effect on the contractile forces of the ventricular muscle.

Stimuli causing reflex bradycardia include:

- Oculocardiac reflex
- Sympathetic response to intracranial hypertension
- Systemically administered norepinephrine (α-adrenergic effects on systemic vasculature exceed the effects of β1-adrenergic effects on the heart)
