= Heart rate variability =

Variation in the time intervals between heartbeats

Heart rate variability visualized with R–R interval changes

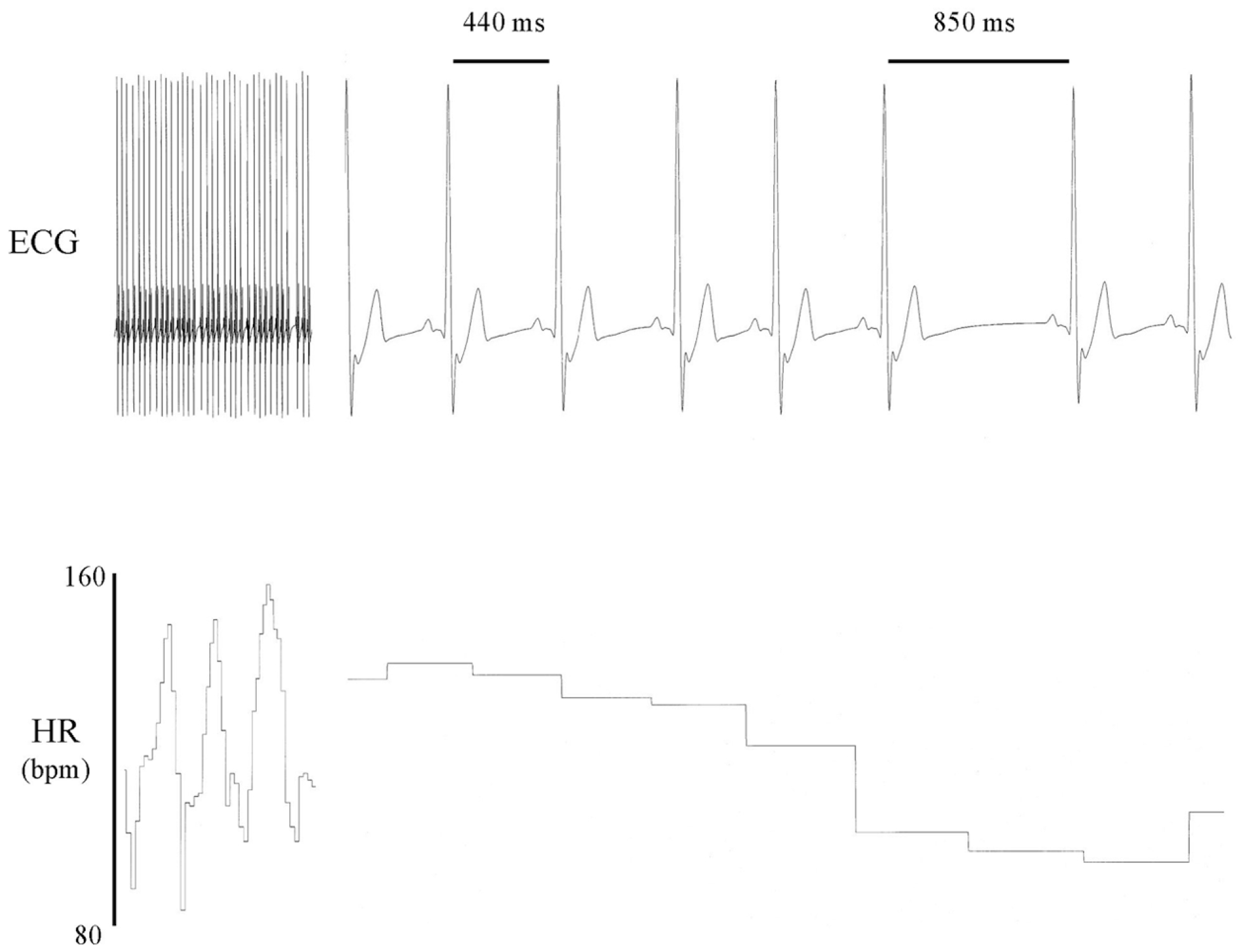
Electrocardiogram (ECG) recording of a canine heart that illustrates beat-to-beat variability in R–R interval (top) and heart rate (bottom).

Heart rate variability (HRV) is the physiological phenomenon of variation in the time interval between heartbeats. It is measured by the variation in the beat-to-beat interval.

Other terms used include cycle length variability, R–R variability (where R is a point corresponding to the peak of the QRS complex of the ECG wave; and R–R is the interval between successive Rs), and heart period variability. Measurement of the R–R interval (often termed normal-to-normal or N–N interval when additional filtering is used) is used to derive heart rate variability.

Methods used to detect beats include ECG, blood pressure, ballistocardiograms, and the pulse wave signal derived from a photoplethysmograph (PPG). ECG is considered the gold standard for HRV measurement because it provides a direct reflection of cardiac electric activity.

== Variability ==
Variability (or variation) in the beat-to-beat interval is a physiological phenomenon. Power spectral analysis of the beat-to-beat variations of heart rate or the heart period (R–R interval) partitions the total variance (the "power") of a continuous series of beats into its frequency components, typically identifying two or three main peaks: Very Low Frequency (VLF) <0.04 Hz, Low Frequency (LF), 0.04–0.15 Hz, and High Frequency (HF) 0.15–0.4 Hz.

The HF peak is widely believed to reflect cardiac parasympathetic nerve (PSNS) activity while the LF, although more complex, is often assumed to have a dominant sympathetic (SNS) component. Though LF was previously thought to reflect primarily SNS activity, it is now widely accepted that it reflects a mixture of both the SNS and PSNS.

Decreased PSNS activity or increased SNS activity will result in reduced HRV. High frequency (HF) activity (0.15 to 0.40 Hz), especially, has been linked to PSNS activity. Activity in this range is associated with the respiratory sinus arrhythmia (RSA), a vagally mediated modulation of heart rate (which increases during inspiration and decreases during expiration). Less is known about the physiological inputs of the low frequency (LF) activity (0.04 to 0.15 Hz).

The SA node receives several different inputs and the instantaneous heart rate or RR interval and its variation are the results of such inputs. The main inputs are the sympathetic and the parasympathetic nervous system (PSNS) and humoral factors. Respiration gives rise to waves in heart rate mediated primarily via the PSNS, and it is thought that the lag in the baroreceptor feedback loop may give rise to 10 second waves in heart rate (associated with Mayer waves of blood pressure), but this remains controversial.

Factors that affect the input are the baroreflex, thermoregulation, hormones, sleep–wake cycle, meals, physical activity, and stress.

== Clinical significance ==
Reduced HRV has been shown to be a predictor of mortality after myocardial infarction although others have shown that the information in HRV relevant to acute myocardial infarction survival is fully contained in the mean heart rate. A range of other outcomes and conditions may also be associated with modified (usually lower) HRV, including congestive heart failure, diabetic neuropathy, post–cardiac-transplant depression, susceptibility to SIDS and poor survival in premature babies, and fatigue severity in chronic fatigue syndrome. On the other hand, for patients having high blood pressure (hypertension), higher HRV is a risk factor for atrial fibrillation.

== Psychological and social aspects ==
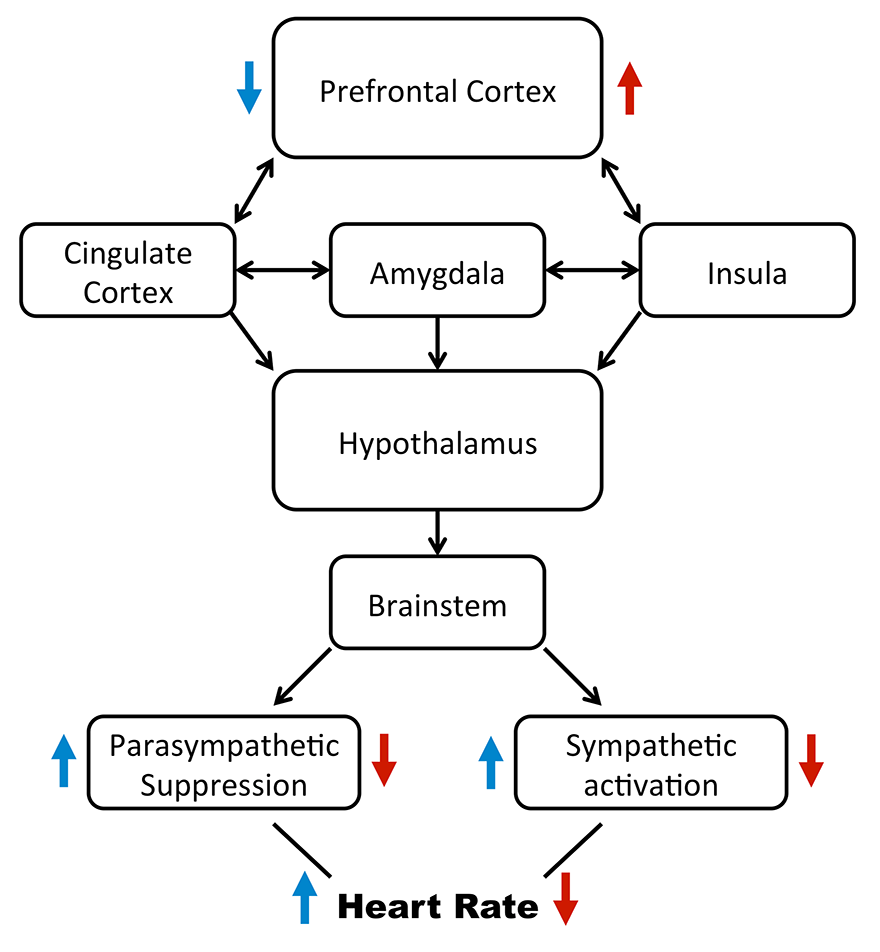
A simplified representation of the neurovisceral integration model

There is interest in HRV in the field of psychophysiology. For example, HRV is related to emotional arousal. High-frequency (HF) activity has been found to decrease under conditions of acute time pressure and emotional strain and elevated anxiety state, presumably related to focused attention and motor inhibition. HRV has been shown to be reduced in individuals reporting to worry more. In individuals with post-traumatic stress disorder (PTSD), HRV and its HF component is reduced whilst the low-frequency (LF) component is elevated. Furthermore, PTSD patients demonstrated no LF or HF reactivity to recalling a traumatic event. Statistical quantitative differences have also been found among healthy, depressed, and psychotic people.

The neurovisceral integration is a model of HRV that views the central autonomic network as the decision maker of cognitive, behavioral and physiological regulation as they pertain to a continuum of emotion. The neurovisceral integration model describes how the prefrontal cortex regulates activity in limbic structures which act to suppress parasympathetic nervous system (PSNS) activity and activate sympathetic nervous system (SNS) circuits. Variation in the output of these two branches of the autonomic system produces HRV and activity in the prefrontal cortex can hence modulate HRV.

HRV is reported to be an index of the influence of both the parasympathetic and the sympathetic nervous system. For example, high HRV is shown to reflect proper emotion regulation, decision-making, and attention, and low HRV reflects the opposite. The parasympathetic nervous system works to decrease the heart rate, while the SNS works to increase the heart rate. For example, someone with high HRV may reflect increased parasympathetic activity, and someone with low HRV may reflect increased sympathetic activity.

Emotions stem from the time and impact of a situation on a person. The ability to regulate emotions is essential for social environments and well-being. HRV has provided a window to the physiological components associated with emotional regulation. HRV has been shown to reflect emotional regulation at two different levels, while resting and while completing a task. Research suggests that a person with higher HRV while resting can provide more appropriate emotional responses compared to those that have low HRV at rest. Empirical research found that HRV can reflect better emotional regulation by those with higher resting HRV, particularly with negative emotions. However, HRV is elevated by negative news in persons who react more strongly to negative news than to positive news. When completing a task, HRV is subject to change, especially when people need to regulate their emotions. Most importantly, individual differences are related to the ability to regulate emotions.

Previous research has suggested that a large part of the attention regulation is due to the default inhibitory properties of the prefrontal cortex. Top-down processes from the prefrontal cortex provide parasympathetic influences, and if for some reason, those influences are active, attention can suffer. Researchers have suggested that HRV can index attention. It was found that groups with high anxiety and low HRV have poor attention. In line with this research, it has also been suggested that increased attention has been linked to high HRV and increased vagus nerve activity. The vagus nerve activity reflects the physiological modulation of the parasympathetic and sympathetic nervous system. The activity behind the prefrontal cortex and the parasympathetic and sympathetic nervous system can influence heart activity. However, people are not all affected the same. A systematic review of HRV and cognitive function suggested that resting HRV can predict individual differences in attentional performance. Furthermore, HRV has been able to index the role of attention and performance, supporting high HRV as a biomarker of increased attention and performance.

Decision-making skills are found to be indexed by HRV in several studies. Previous research has suggested that both emotion and attention are linked to decision making; for example, poor decision making is linked to the inability to regulate or control emotions and attention and vice versa. Decision making is negatively affected by lower HRV and positively affected by higher levels of HRV. Most importantly, resting-state HRV was found to be a significant predictor of cognitive functions such as decision making. HRV, accompanied by a psychological state such as anxiety, has been found to lead to poor decisions. For example, a group of researchers found that low HRV was an index of higher uncertainty leading to poor decision-making skills, especially those with higher levels of anxiety. HRV was also used to assess decision-making skills in a high-risk game and was found to be an index higher sympathetic activation (lower HRV) when making decisions involving risk. HRV can index psychological concepts, such as the ones outlined above, to assess the demand for the situations that people experience.

The polyvagal theory is another way to describe the pathways in the autonomic nervous system that mediate HRV. The polyvagal theory highlights three main ordinal processes, inactive response to an environmental threat, the active response to an environmental threat, and the fluctuation between the connect and disconnect to an environmental threat. This theory, like others, decomposes heart rate variability based on frequency domain characteristics. However, it places more emphasis on respiratory sinus arrhythmia and its transmission by a hypothesized neural pathway distinct from other components of HRV. There is anatomic and physiological evidence for a polyvagal control of the heart.

== Phenomena ==
There are two primary fluctuations:

- Respiratory arrhythmia (or respiratory sinus arrhythmia) is directly caused by the central respiratory rhythm, which tracks the respiratory rate across a range of frequencies and is a major cause of heart rate variability in humans. The respiratory rhythm contributes to sinus arrhythmia in normal unanesthetized subjects during mechanical hyperventilation with positive pressure.
- Low-frequency oscillations are associated with Mayer waves (Traube–Hering–Mayer waves) of blood pressure and is usually at a frequency of 0.1 Hz, or a 10-second period.

=== Pattern formation in heart rate ===
The regulation of heart rate, encompassing both acceleration and deceleration of the heartbeat, is highly specific. Distinct patterns in heart rate can be observed during everyday movements, such as kneeling down or standing up. These patterns reflect highly sensitive physiological regulatory mechanisms that enable a healthy heart to adapt to various life influences.

== Artifact ==
Errors in the location of the instantaneous heart beat will result in errors in the calculation of the HRV. HRV is highly sensitive to artifact and errors in as low as even 2% of the data will result in unwanted biases in HRV calculations. To ensure accurate results therefore it is critical to manage artifact and RR errors appropriately prior to performing any HRV analyses.

Robust management of artifacts, including RWave identification, interpolation and exclusion requires a high degree of care and precision. This can be very time-consuming in large studies with data recorded over long durations. Software packages are able to assist users with a variety of robust and tested artifact management tools. These software programs also include some automated capability but it is important that a human review any automated artifact management and edit accordingly.

== Analysis ==
The most widely used methods can be grouped under time-domain and frequency-domain. A joint European and American task-force described standards in HRV measurements in 1996. Other methods have been proposed, such as non-linear methods.

=== Time-domain methods ===
Time-domain methods are based on the beat-to-beat or NN intervals (typically determined from RR intervals), which are analysed to give variables such as:

- SDNN (standard deviation of NN intervals). Often calculated over a 24-hour period. SDNN reflects all the cyclic components responsible for variability in the period of recording, therefore it represents total variability.
- SDANN (standard deviation of the average NN intervals) calculated over short periods, usually 5 minutes. SDANN is therefore a measure of changes in heart rate due to cycles longer than 5 minutes.
- RMSSD (root mean square of successive differences), the square root of the mean of the squares of the successive differences between adjacent NNs.
- SDSD (standard deviation of successive differences), the standard deviation of the successive differences between adjacent NNs.
- NN50, the number of pairs of successive NNs that differ by more than 50 ms.
- pNN50, the proportion of NN50 divided by total number of NNs.
- NN20, the number of pairs of successive NNs that differ by more than 20 ms.
- pNN20, the proportion of NN20 divided by total number of NNs.
- EBC (estimated breath cycle), the range (max-min) within a moving window of a given time duration within the study period. The windows can move in a self-overlapping way or be strictly distinct (sequential) windows. EBC is often provided in data acquisition scenarios where HRV feedback in real time is a primary goal. EBC derived from PPG over 10-second and 16-second sequential and overlapping windows has been shown to correlate highly with SDNN.

=== Geometric methods ===
The series of NN intervals also can be converted into a geometric pattern such as: Geometric Measures HRV triangular index: integral of density distribution / maximum of density distribution maximum HRV triangular index = Number of all NN intervals / maximum number. Dependent on the length of the bin -> quote the bin size+ relative insensitive to the analytic quality of the series of NN intervals – need of reasonable number of NN intervals to generate the geometric pattern (in practice 20 min to 24 h) – not appropriate to assess short-term changes in HRV

- the sample density distribution of NN interval durations;
- sample density distribution of differences between adjacent NN intervals;
- a scatterplot of each NN (or RR) interval with the immediately preceding NN (or RR) interval – also called "Poincare plot" or (apparently in error) a "Lorenz plot"; and so forth. A simple formula is then used that judges the variability on the basis of the geometric and/or graphics properties of the resulting pattern.

=== Frequency-domain methods ===
Frequency domain methods assign bands of frequency and then count the number of NN intervals that match each band. The bands are typically high frequency (HF) from 0.15 to 0.4 Hz, low frequency (LF) from 0.04 to 0.15 Hz, and the very low frequency (VLF) from 0.0033 to 0.04 Hz. HF power reflects stimulation by the parasympathetic nervous system (PNS), whereas LF power reflects stimulation by both the sympathetic nervous system (SNS) and the PNS. VLF power is associated with thermoregulation, the renin–angiotensin system. and peripheral vasomotor activity.

Several methods of analysis are available. Power spectral density (PSD), using parametric or nonparametric methods, provides basic information on the power distribution across frequencies. One of the most commonly used PSD methods is the discrete Fourier transform. Methods for the calculation of PSD may be generally classified as nonparametric and parametric. In most instances, both methods provide comparable results. The advantages of the nonparametric methods are (1) the simplicity of the algorithm used (fast Fourier transform [FFT] in most of the cases) and (2) the high processing speed. The advantages of parametric methods are (1) smoother spectral components that can be distinguished independent of preselected frequency bands, (2) easy postprocessing of the spectrum with an automatic calculation of low- and high-frequency power components with an easy identification of the central frequency of each component, and (3) an accurate estimation of PSD even on a small number of samples on which the signal is supposed to maintain stationarity. The basic disadvantage of parametric methods is the need of verification of the suitability of the chosen model and of its complexity (that is, the order of the model).

In addition to classical FFT-based methods used for the calculation of frequency parameters, a more appropriate PSD estimation method is the Lomb–Scargle periodogram. Analysis has shown that the LS periodogram can produce a more accurate estimate of the PSD than FFT methods for typical RR data. Since the RR data is an unevenly sampled data, another advantage of the LS method is that in contrast to FFT-based methods it is able to be used without the need to resample and detrend the RR data.

Alternatively, to avoid artefacts that are created when calculating the power of a signal that includes a single high-intensity peak (for example caused by an arrhythmic heart beat), the concept of the 'instantaneous Amplitude' has been introduced, which is based on the Hilbert transform of the RR data.

A newly used HRV index, which depends on the wavelet entropy measures, is an alternative choice. The wavelet entropy measures are calculated using a three-step procedure defined in the literature. First, the wavelet packet algorithm is implemented using the Daubechies 4 (DB4) function as the mother wavelet with a scale of 7. Once the wavelet coefficients are obtained, the energy for each coefficient are calculated as described in the literature. After calculating the normalized values of wavelet energies, which represent the relative wavelet energy (or the probability distribution), the wavelet entropies are obtained using the definition of entropy given by Shannon.

=== Non-linear methods ===
Given the complexity of the mechanisms regulating heart rate, it is reasonable to assume that applying HRV analysis based on methods of non-linear dynamics will yield valuable information. Although chaotic behavior has been assumed, more rigorous testing has shown that heart rate variability cannot be described as a low dimensional chaotic process. However, application of chaotic globals to HRV has been shown to predict diabetes status. The most commonly used non-linear method of analysing heart rate variability is the Poincaré plot. Each data point represents a pair of successive beats, the x-axis is the current RR interval, while the y-axis is the previous RR interval. HRV is quantified by fitting mathematically defined geometric shapes to the data. Other methods used are the correlation dimension, symbolic dynamics, nonlinear predictability, pointwise correlation dimension, approximate entropy, sample entropy, multiscale entropy analysis, sample asymmetry and memory length (based on inverse statistical analysis). It is also possible to represent long range correlations geometrically.

=== Long-term correlations ===
Sequences of RR intervals have been found to have long-term correlations. However, one flaw with these analyses is their lack of goodness-of-fit statistics, i.e. values are derived that may or may not have adequate statistical rigor. Different types of correlations have been found during different sleep stages.

== Heart rate dependence of HRV parameters ==
The parameters used to characterize HRV strongly depend on heart rate (HR), but many articles have not adjusted properly or at all for HR differences when comparing HRV in multiple circumstances.

The exact effect of HR on HRV is still not well understood. For time domain parameters (RMSSD, SDNN, etc.), research suggests either an exponential or a hyperbolic dependence. A method proposed in 2022 involves fitting a HRV-HR curve specific to the individual, which showed high precision and stability on short and medium terms (hours to months time scale).

== Duration and circumstances of ECG recording ==
Time domain methods are preferred to frequency domain methods when short-term recordings are investigated. This is due to the fact that the recording should be at least 10 times the wavelength of the lowest frequency bound of interest. Thus, recording of approximately 1 minute is needed to assess the HF components of HRV (i.e., a lowest bound of 0.15 Hz is a cycle of 6.6 seconds and so 10 cycles require ~60 seconds), while more than 4 minutes are needed to address the LF component (with a lower bound of 0.04 Hz).

Although time domain methods, especially the SDNN and RMSSD methods, can be used to investigate recordings of long durations, a substantial part of the long-term variability is day–night differences. Thus, long-term recordings analyzed by time domain methods should contain at least 18 hours of analyzable ECG data that include the whole night.

== Physiological correlates of HRV components ==
=== Autonomic influences of heart rate ===
Although cardiac automaticity is intrinsic to various pacemaker tissues, heart rate and rhythm are largely under the control of the autonomic nervous system. The parasympathetic influence on heart rate is mediated via release of acetylcholine by the vagus nerve. Muscarinic acetylcholine receptors respond to this release mostly by an increase in cell membrane K+ conductance. Acetylcholine also inhibits the hyperpolarization-activated "pacemaker" current. The "Ik decay" hypothesis proposes that pacemaker depolarization results from slow deactivation of the delayed rectifier current, Ik, which, due to a time-independent background inward current, causes diastolic depolarization. Conversely, the "If activation" hypothesis suggests that after action potential termination, If provides a slowly activating inward current predominating over decaying Ik, thus initiating slow diastolic depolarization.

The sympathetic influence on heart rate is mediated by release of epinephrine and norepinephrine. Activation of β-adrenergic receptors results in cAMP-mediated phosphorylation of membrane proteins and increases in ICaL and in If the result is an acceleration of the slow diastolic depolarization.

Under resting conditions, vagal tone prevails and variations in heart period are largely dependent on vagal modulation. The vagal and sympathetic activity constantly interact. Because the sinus node is rich in acetylcholinesterase, the effect of any vagal impulse is brief because the acetylcholine is rapidly hydrolyzed. Parasympathetic influences exceed sympathetic effects probably through two independent mechanisms: a cholinergically induced reduction of norepinephrine released in response to sympathetic activity, and a cholinergic attenuation of the response to an adrenergic stimulus.

=== Components ===
The RR interval variations present during resting conditions represent beat-by-beat variations in cardiac autonomic inputs. However, efferent vagal (parasympathetic) activity is a major contributor to the HF component, as seen in clinical and experimental observations of autonomic maneuvers such as electrical vagal stimulation, muscarinic receptor blockade, and vagotomy. More problematic is the interpretation of the LF component, which was considered by some as a marker of sympathetic modulation (especially when expressed in normalized units) but is now known to include both sympathetic and vagal influences. For example, during sympathetic activation the resulting tachycardia is usually accompanied by a marked reduction in total power, whereas the reverse occurs during vagal activation. Thus the spectral components change in the same direction and do not indicate that LF faithfully reflects sympathetic effects.

HRV measures fluctuations in autonomic inputs to the heart rather than the mean level of autonomic inputs. Thus, both withdrawal and saturatingly high levels of autonomic input to the heart can lead to diminished HRV.

== Changes related to biologic states and pathologies ==
A reduction of HRV has been reported in several cardiovascular and noncardiovascular diseases.

=== Myocardial infarction ===
Depressed HRV after MI may reflect a decrease in vagal activity directed to the heart. HRV in patients surviving an acute MI reveal a reduction in total and in the individual power of spectral components. The presence of an alteration in neural control is also reflected in a blunting of day-night variations of RR interval. In post-MI patients with a very depressed HRV, most of the residual energy is distributed in the VLF frequency range below 0.03 Hz, with only a small respiration-related variations.

=== Diabetic neuropathy ===
In neuropathy associated with diabetes mellitus characterized by alteration in small nerve fibers, a reduction in time domain parameters of HRV seems not only to carry negative prognostic value but also to precede the clinical expression of autonomic neuropathy. In diabetic patients without evidence of autonomic neuropathy, reduction of the absolute power of LF and HF during controlled conditions was also reported. Similarly, diabetic patients can be differentiated from normal controls on the basis of reduction in HRV.

=== Heart transplants ===
A very reduced HRV with no definite spectral components has been reported in patients with a recent heart transplant. The appearance of discrete spectral components in a few patients is considered to reflect cardiac reinnervation. This reinnervation may occur as early as 1 to 2 years after transplantation and is assumed to be of sympathetic origin. In addition, a correlation between respiratory rate and the HF component of HRV observed in some transplanted patients also indicates that a nonneural mechanism may generate a respiration-related rhythmic oscillation.

=== Myocardial dysfunction ===
A reduced HRV has been observed consistently in patients with cardiac failure. In this condition characterized by signs of sympathetic activation such as faster heart rates and high levels of circulating catecholamines, a relation between changes in HRV and the extent of left ventricular dysfunction was reported. In fact, whereas the reduction in time domain measures of HRV seemed to parallel the severity of the disease, the relationship between spectral components and indices of ventricular dysfunction appears to be more complex. In particular, in most patients with a very advanced phase of the disease and with a drastic reduction in HRV, an LF component could not be detected despite the clinical signs of sympathetic activation. This reflects that, as stated above, the LF may not accurately reflect cardiac sympathetic tone.

=== Liver cirrhosis ===
Liver cirrhosis is associated with decreased HRV. Decreased HRV in patients with cirrhosis has a prognostic value and predicts mortality. Loss of HRV is also associated with higher plasma pro-inflammatory cytokine levels and impaired neurocognitive function in this patient population.

=== Sepsis ===
HRV is decreased in patients with sepsis. Loss of HRV has both diagnostic and prognostic value in neonates with sepsis. The pathophysiology of decreased HRV in sepsis is not well understood but there is experimental evidence to show that partial uncoupling of cardiac pacemaker cells from autonomic neural control may play a role in decreased HRV during acute systemic inflammation. (Decreased HRV is generally lower in inflammatory conditions).

=== Tetraplegia ===
Patients with chronic complete high cervical spinal cord lesions have intact efferent vagal neural pathways directed to the sinus node. However, an LF component can be detected in HRV and arterial pressure variabilities of some tetraplegic patients. Thus, the LF component of HRV in those without intact sympathetic inputs to the heart represent vagal modulation.

=== Sudden cardiac death ===
Victims of sudden cardiac death have been found to have had lower HRV than healthy individuals. HRV can be observed to be depressed prior to the development of SCD, which raises questions about whether or not altered autonomic function plays a role in the development of electrical instability. HRV is also depressed in SCD survivors, who are at high risk for subsequent episodes. HRV is markedly decreased prior to both fatal and non-fatal arrhythmias.

=== Cancer ===
HRV correlates with the progression of disease and outcome of cancer patients, according to a systematic review of published studies. Patients in the early stages of cancer have a significantly higher HRV when compared to patients in the later stages of cancer, suggesting disease severity influences HRV. Different ranges of HRV can be observed between cancer types.

=== Pregnancy ===
HRV alterations occur in healthy pregnancies as well as similar changes in pregnancies with gestational diabetes that include lower HRV mean values.

=== Mood and anxiety disorders ===
Low RMSSD, thought to represent vagal tone, have been associated with major depression. Lower SDNN and elevated LF/HF were found in those with bipolar disorder, and in particular those characterized as having greater illness severity due to greater number of episodes, illness duration and whether there had been psychosis. Patients with PTSD also had lower HF, a measure of vagal tone.

== Modifications by specific interventions ==
Interventions that augment HRV may be protective against cardiac mortality and sudden cardiac death. Although the rationale for changing HRV is sound, it also contains the inherent danger of leading to the unwarranted assumption that modification of HRV translates directly into cardiac protection, which may not be the case. Despite the growing consensus that increases in vagal activity can be beneficial, it is not as yet known how much vagal activity (or HRV as a marker) has to increase in order to provide adequate protection.

=== β-Adrenergic blockade ===
The data on the effect of β-blockers on HRV in post-MI patients are surprisingly scant. Despite the observation of statistically significant increases, the actual changes are very modest. In conscious post-MI dogs, β-blockers do not modify HRV. The unexpected observation that before MI, β-blockade increases HRV only in the animals destined to be at low risk for lethal arrhythmias after MI may suggest novel approaches to post-MI risk stratification.

=== Antiarrhythmic drugs ===
Data exist for several antiarrhythmic drugs. Flecainide and propafenone but not amiodarone were reported to decrease time domain measures of HRV in patients with chronic ventricular arrhythmia. In another study, propafenone reduced HRV and decreased LF much more than HF. A larger study confirmed that flecainide, also encainide and moricizine, decreased HRV in post-MI patients but found no correlation between the change in HRV and mortality during follow-up. Thus, some antiarrhythmic drugs associated with increased mortality can reduce HRV. However, it is not known whether these changes in HRV have any direct prognostic significance.

=== Scopolamine ===
Low-dose muscarinic receptor blockers, such as atropine and scopolamine, may produce a paradoxical increase in vagal effects on the heart, as suggested by a decrease in heart rate. In addition, scopolamine and low dose atropine can markedly increase HRV. However, though the heart rate slowing in proportional to the (low) dose of atropine, the increase in HRV varies widely across and within individuals. This suggests that even for vagal activity to the heart, HRV may be a limited marker.

=== Thrombolysis ===
The effect of thrombolysis on HRV (assessed by pNN50) was reported in 95 patients with acute MI. HRV was higher 90 minutes after thrombolysis in the patients with patency of the infarct-related artery. However, this difference was no longer evident when the entire 24 hours were analyzed.

=== Exercise training ===
Exercise training may decrease cardiovascular mortality and sudden cardiac death. Regular exercise training is also thought to modify cardiac autonomic control. Individuals who exercise regularly have a 'training bradycardia' (i.e., low resting heart rate) and generally have higher HRV than sedentary individuals. In addition, individuals with a greater sample entropy show larger post-exercise vagal withdrawal.

=== Biofeedback ===
The technique called resonant breathing biofeedback teaches how to recognize and control involuntary heart rate variability. A randomized study by Sutarto et al. assessed the effect of resonant breathing biofeedback among manufacturing operators; depression, anxiety and stress significantly decreased. A first overall meta-analysis by Goessl VC et al. (24 studies, 484 individuals, 2017) indicates ''HRV biofeedback training is associated with a large reduction in self-reported stress and anxiety'', while mentioning that more well-controlled studies are needed.

=== Wind instruments ===
One study that surveyed the physiological effects of playing Native American flutes found a significant HRV increase when playing both low-pitched and high-pitched flutes.

== Normal HRV values ==
Even though there are no widely accepted standard values for HRV that can be used for clinical purposes, multiple studies have measured and reported normal values for various populations:

Normal Values of Standard Measures of HRV
Time Domain Analysis			Spectral Analysis		
Variable	Units	Normal Values (mean±SD)	Variable	Units	Normal Values (mean±SD)
IBI	ms	926±90	LF	ms^{2}	519±291
SDNN	ms	50±16	HF	ms^{2}	657±777
RMSSD	ms	42±15	LF	nu	52±10
			HF	nu	40±10
			LF/HF ratio		2.8±2.6

Time Domain Analysis Abbreviations

IBI is InterBeat Interval, the time period between successive heartbeats (Normal-to-Normal interbeat interval, also known as the R–R interval), measured in milliseconds (ms). SDNN is Standard Deviation of Normal-to-Normal interbeat intervals measured in milliseconds. RMSSD is Root Mean Square of Successive Differences between normal heartbeats measured in milliseconds. The conventional recording time is five minutes.

Spectral Analysis Abbreviations

LF is Power of the Low Frequency range [ms squared (ms^{2}) or normal units (nu)] HF is Power of the High Frequency range [ms squared (ms^{2}) or normal units (nu)] LF/HF is the ratio of LF-to-HF power

== See also ==
- Heart rate turbulence
- Sinus rhythm
