= Vagal tone =

Activity of the vagus nerve

Vagal tone is activity of the vagus nerve (the 10th cranial nerve) and a fundamental component of the parasympathetic branch of the autonomic nervous system. This branch of the nervous system is not under conscious control and is largely responsible for the regulation of several body compartments at rest. Vagal activity results in various effects, including: heart rate reduction, vasodilation/constriction of vessels, glandular activity in the heart, lungs, and digestive tract, liver, immune system regulation as well as control of gastrointestinal sensitivity, motility and inflammation.

In this context, tone specifically refers to the continual nature of baseline parasympathetic action that the vagus nerve exerts. While baseline vagal input is constant, the degree of stimulation it exerts is regulated by a balance of inputs from sympathetic and parasympathetic divisions of the autonomic nervous system, with parasympathetic activity generally being dominant. Vagal tone is frequently used to assess heart function, and is also useful in assessing emotional regulation and other processes that alter, or are altered by, changes in parasympathetic activity.

Measurements of vagal tone can be performed by means of either invasive or noninvasive procedures. Invasive procedures are in the minority and include vagus nerve stimulation by specific manual, breathing or electrical techniques. Noninvasive techniques mainly rely on the investigation of heart rate and heart rate variability.

== Noninvasive vagal tone quantification ==
In most cases, vagal tone is not measured directly. Instead the processes affected by the vagus nerve – specifically heart rate and heart rate variability – are measured and used as a surrogate for vagal tone. Increased vagal tone (and thus vagal action) is generally associated with a lower heart rate and increased heart rate variability. However, during graded orthostatic tilt, vagal tone withdrawal is an indirect indicator of cardiovascular fitness.

=== Vagal innervation of the heart ===
Heart rate is largely controlled by the heart's internal pacemaker activity. In a healthy heart, the main pacemaker is a collection of cells on the border of the atria and vena cava called the sinoatrial node. Heart cells exhibit automaticity, the ability to generate electrical activity independent of external stimulation. The electrical activity spontaneously generated by the sinoatrial node sets the pace for the rest of the heart.

In absence of external stimuli, sinoatrial pacing generally, while awake, maintains the heart rate in the range of 60–100 beats per minute (bpm). The two branches of the autonomic nervous system work together to increase or slow the heart rate. The vagus nerve acts on the sinoatrial node, slowing its conduction and modulating vagal tone, via the neurotransmitter acetylcholine and downstream changes to ionic currents and calcium of heart cells. Because of its effect on heart rate, and cardio health, vagal tone can be measured and understood by examining its correlation to heart rate modulation and heart rate variability.

=== Respiratory sinus arrhythmia ===
Respiratory sinus arrhythmia (RSA) is typically a benign, normal variation in heart rate that occurs during each breathing cycle: the heart rate increases when breathing in and decreases when breathing out. RSA was first recognized by Carl Ludwig in 1847 but is still imperfectly understood. It has been observed in humans from the early stages of life through adulthood, and is found in several different species.

During inhalation, the intra-thoracic pressure lowers due to the contraction and downward movement of the diaphragm and the expansion of the chest cavity. Atrial pressure is also lowered as a result, causing increased blood flow to the heart, which in turn decreases baroreceptors firing response which diminishes vagal tone. This causes an increase in heart rate.

During exhalation, the diaphragm relaxes, moving upward, and decreases the size of the chest cavity, causing an increase in intrathoracic pressure. This increase in pressure inhibits venous return to the heart resulting in both reduced atrial expansion and increased activation of baroreceptors. This relieves the suppression of vagal tone and leads to a decreased heart rate.

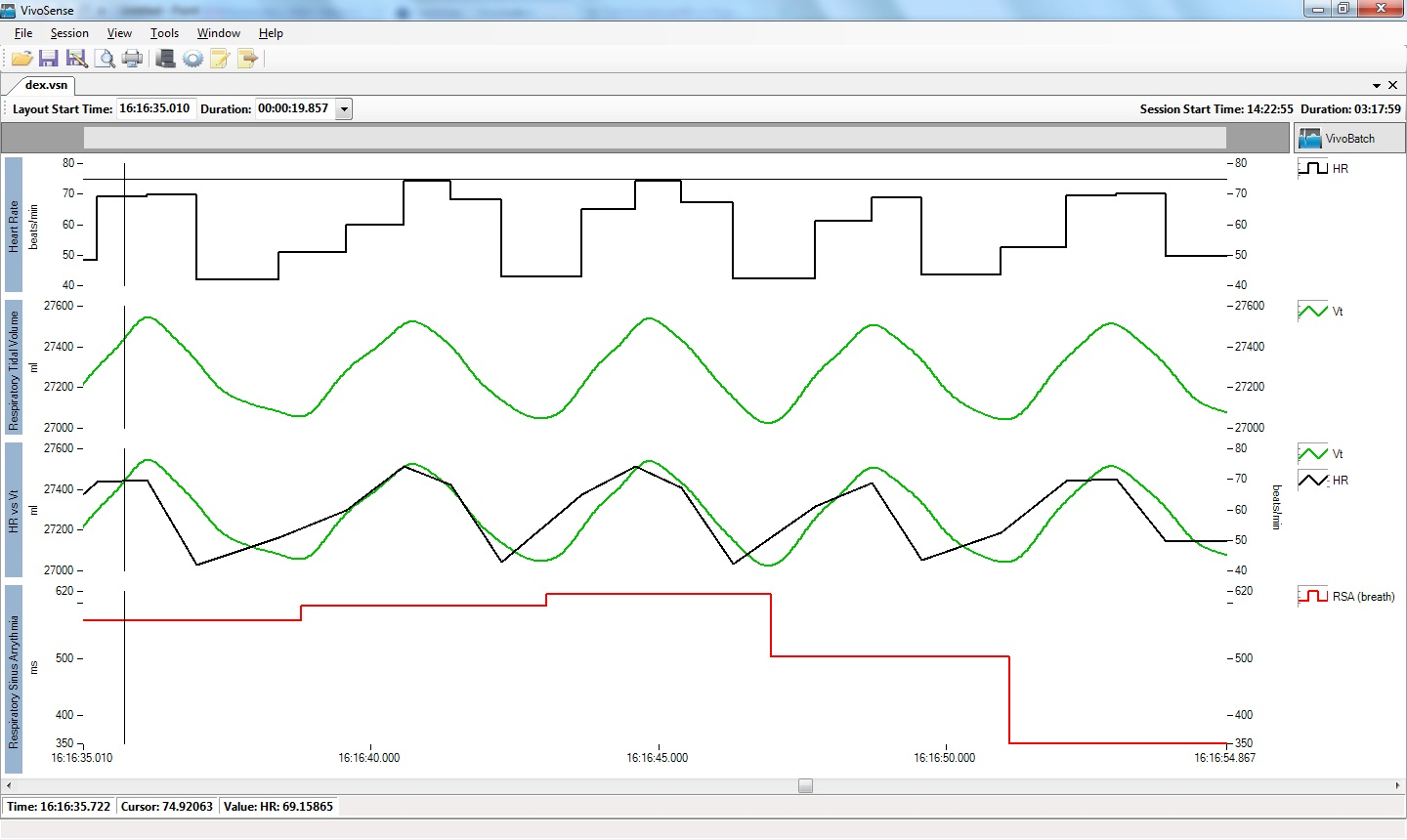
Heart rate (HR) (first row), tidal volume (Vt) (second row), Vt and superimposed HR (third row). The HR modulation is clearly visible: HR increases with inspiration and decreases with expiration.

Heart rate (HR) (first row), ECG signal (ECG) (second row), and respiration (third row) for a newborn subject in a 15-seconds recording. HR expresses oscillations synchronous with respect to respiration.

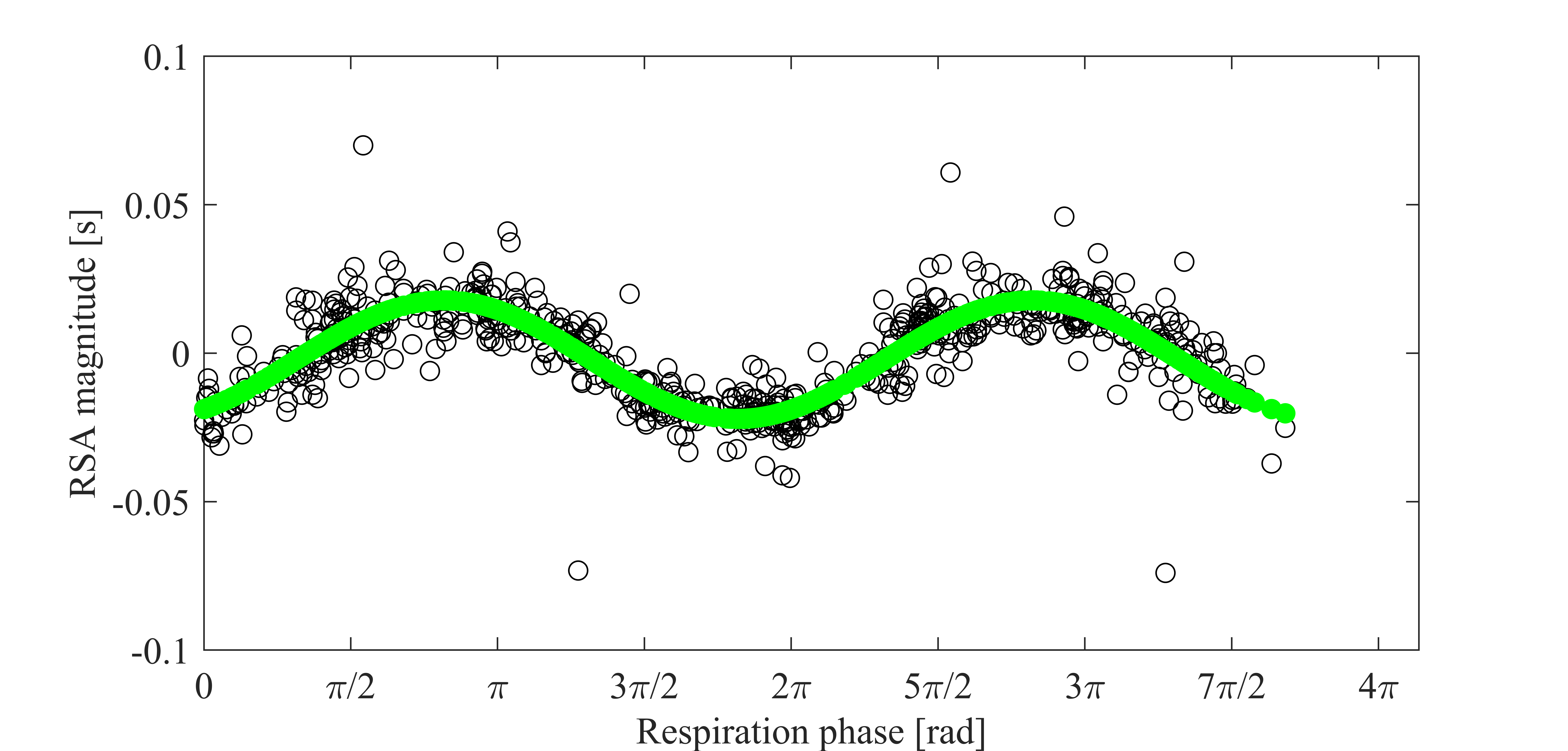
RSA magnitude estimation based on a multivariate approach based on joint analysis of ECG and respiration. The green line shows the heart rate variations averaged over several breathing cycles. This clearly shows the trends that are typical of RSA.

==== RSA as a vagal tone estimator ====
Respiratory sinus arrhythmia (RSA) is frequently used as a noninvasive method for investigating vagal tone, in physiological, behavioral, and several clinical studies. This can be done using electrocardiography (ECG) recording, although other methods are also being developed that take advantage of the interactions between ECG and respiration. Interpretation of RSA measurements must be done with care, however, as several factors including differences between individuals can change the relationship between RSA and vagal tone.

==== Evolution and physiology ====
It has been suggested that RSA may have evolved to save energy for both cardiac and respiratory systems by reducing the heart rate and by suppressing ineffective ventilation during the ebb of perfusion (delivery of blood from arteries to capillaries for oxygenation and nutrition).

RSA has been found to increase in subjects in resting state and to decrease in states of stress or tension. It is increased in supine position and decreased in prone position, and is on average higher and more pronounced during the day as compared to the night. RSA has also been extensively used to quantify vagal tone withdrawal in graded orthostatic tilt.

Typically, expression of RSA decreases with age. However, adults in excellent cardiovascular health, such as endurance runners, swimmers, and cyclists, are likely to have a more pronounced RSA. Professional athletes on average maintain very high vagal tone and consequently higher RSA levels. RSA is less prominent in individuals with diabetes and cardiovascular disease.

==== Insights into psychology and disease ====
Vagal tone research has the potential to offer insight into social behavior, social interactions, and human psychology. Much of this work has been focused on newborns and children. Baseline vagal tone can be used either as a potential predictor of behavior or as a signal of mental health (particularly emotion regulation, anxiety, and internalizing and externalizing disorders).

The polyvagal theory by Porges is an influential model of how the vagal pathways respond to novelty and to stressful external stimuli. The theory proposes that there are two vagal systems, one that is shared with reptiles and amphibia and a second, more recent, system that is unique to mammals. The two pathways behave differently and can work against each other. This theory can account for several psychophysiological phenomena and psychosomatic illnesses. However, recent studies indicate that the vagal "system" described by Porges as being unique to mammals existed long before the evolution of mammals.

=== Other estimates of vagal tone ===
There are several methods of estimating vagal tone other than measuring RSA, including:

- Indexes of beat-to-beat variability such as RMSSD reported by The Task Force of the European Society of Cardiology and Heart Rhythm Society. Frequency analysis of heart rate in the range 0.15–0.4 Hz has been reported to quantify vagal tone.
- Computation of the "power spectrum", or the ratio between the low frequency and high frequency spectral components, of heart rate variability. This has been used to measure the change in sympatho-vagal balance during hypnosis.

== See also ==
- Autonomic nervous system
- Parasympathetic nervous system
- Vagus nerve
- Vagus nerve stimulation
- Heart rate variability
- Sinus arrhythmia
- Bainbridge reflex
