= Poincaré plot =

Time series plot of a dynamical system

A Poincaré plot, named after Henri Poincaré, is a graphical representation used to visualize the relationship between consecutive data points in time series to detect patterns and irregularities in the time series, revealing information about the stability of dynamical systems, providing insights into periodic orbits, chaotic motions, and bifurcations. It plays a role in controlling and predicting the system's long-term behavior, making it an indispensable tool for various scientific and engineering disciplines. It is also known as a return map. Poincaré plots can be used to distinguish chaos from randomness by embedding a data set in a higher-dimensional state space.

Given a time series of the form
$$x_t, x_{t+1}, x_{t+2}, \ldots, N,$$
a Poincaré map in its simplest form first plots dots in a scatter plot at the positions $(x_t, x_{t+1})$, then plots $(x_{t+1}, x_{t+2})$, then $(x_{t+2}, x_{t+3})$, and so on.

== Example: logistic map ==
For iterative (discrete-time) maps, the Poincaré map represents the function that maps the values of the system from one time step to the next. In the logistic map $x_{n+1} = r x_n (1 - x_n)$, the Poincaré plot would represent a shape corresponding to the function $f(x) = r x (1 - x)$.

Time series of logistic map (left) and its corresponding Poincaré map (right)

== Applications in electrocardiography ==
An electrocardiogram (ECG) is a tracing of the voltage changes in the chest generated by the heart, whose contraction in a normal person is triggered by an electrical impulse that originates in the sinoatrial node. The ECG normally consists of a series of waves, labeled the P, Q, R, S and T waves. The P wave represents depolarization of the atria, the Q–R–S series of waves depolarization of the ventricles and the T wave repolarization of the ventricles. The interval between two successive R waves (the RR interval) is a measure of the heart rate.

The heart rate normally varies slightly: during a deep breath, it speeds up and during a deep exhalation, it slows down. (The RR interval will shorten when the heart speeds up, and lengthen when it slows.) An RR tachograph is a graph of the numerical value of the RR interval versus time.

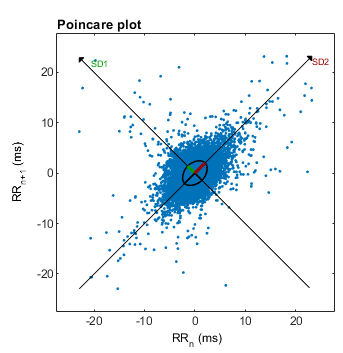
Poincaré plot showing sympathetic dominance (SD2)

In the context of RR tachography, a Poincaré plot is a graph of RR(n) on the x axis versus RR(n + 1) (the succeeding RR interval) on the y axis, i.e. one takes a sequence of intervals and plots each interval against the following interval. The Poincaré plot is used as a standard visualizing technique to detect the presence of oscillations in heart rate variability and other non-linear dynamic systems. In the context of electrocardiography, the rate of the healthy heart is normally tightly controlled by the body's regulatory mechanisms (specifically, by the autonomic nervous system). Several research papers demonstrate the potential of ECG signal-based Poincaré plots in detecting heart-related diseases or abnormalities.

Various characteristics of the plot can be quantified, such as the SD1 and SD2 values, which are the standard deviation of the points as measured in the direction perpendicular to and along the line of identity, respectively. SD2 represents long-term variations, and the ratio of SD1:SD2 is often measured. An ellipse with these dimensions is often fitted to the plot, and the area of this ellipse can also be measured.

== See also ==
- Recurrence plot
- Poincaré map
- Heart rate variability (HRV), a use of Poincaré plots to assess heart functionality.
- PhysioNet tool for constructing multi-scale Poincaré plots from a heartbeat time series.
