= Ferruginea =

Ferruginea, a Latin word meaning "ferruginous" or "rusty", may refer to:

- Substantia ferruginea, an underlying patch of deeply pigmented nerve cells that give the locus ceruleus its bluish-gray color
- a Magnolia grandiflora cultivar
