= Baroreflex activation therapy =

- Mechanism of baroreflex activation therapy
- Specialty: Cardiology

Baroreflex activation therapy is an approach to treating high blood pressure and the symptoms of heart failure. It uses an implanted device to electrically stimulate baroreceptors in the carotid sinus region. This elicits a reflex response through the sympathetic and vagal nervous systems that reduces blood pressure.

== Medical uses ==
Baroreflex activation therapy is used to reduce the symptoms of heart failure in patients who do not qualify for cardiac resynchronization therapy.

== Adverse effects ==
In common with pacemakers, implantation of baroreflex activation therapy devices carries risks of bleeding, bruising and infection.

High stimulation voltages can cause an appreciable sensation which can be unpleasant. In typical use the device output voltage is adjusted to below the level that causes unpleasant sensations.

== Devices ==
Device development benefited from the related technology of pacemakers which have markedly reduced in size and increased in efficiency since their introduction in 1958. The falling cost of the fundamental technology that combines a long-lasting battery, stimulating electrode and a microcontroller in a single device, made it possible to create specialized devices to activate baroreceptors. Examples are the Rheos and the Barostim Neo systems. In 2019, the FDA awarded the BAROSTIM NEO® a Breakthrough Device Designation and approved the device for the treatment of heart failure. It is currently available in Europe and the United States.

== Procedure ==
The device is implanted into upper chest with the electrodes placed in the neck. First, an incision is made in the neck to visualize the carotid bifurcation. The electrode is placed over the carotid artery and positioned where stimulating through it elicits a blood pressure reduction. The electrode is then sutured in place. The main part of the device (also called the pulse generator) is then placed in a pocket underneath the skin.

Adjustments of the stimulation pattern (size and frequency of pulses) are made using a device programmer which communicates with the implanted device through short-range radio signals. Stimulation is set at a level that reduces blood pressure but does not cause discomfort.

== Mechanism ==
Baroreflex activation is distinct from vagal stimulation. Electrical stimulation of the external surfaces of the carotid sinus activates baroreceptors believed to be in the adventitia of the artery. This stimulates an afferent limb which activates central nervous system pathways that in turn exert two different but synergistic autonomic effects on the body. First, global sympathetic outflow is reduced and, second, vagal outflow is increased.

These two autonomic effector pathways reduce heart rate and vasomotor tone, leading to a reduction in blood pressure. Effects can be seen within a few seconds of initiation of stimulation, a feature which is used in the initial implant procedure to aid positioning of the electrode.

== History ==
Despite modern medications against high blood pressure, only around half of people with hypertension in England, USA and Canada have blood pressure at or below target levels.

In many cases the situation can be resolved with increases in antihypertensive medication. However in about 10% of patients, blood pressure is still above target (140/90mm Hg) despite at least 3 anti-hypertensives, a status known as resistant hypertension.

Some patients prefer not to be prescribed progressively greater number of medications, because of side effects or the difficulty managing a complex medication regime. Despite the greater invasiveness, they may prefer the option of a device that can contribute to blood pressure control. Electrical stimulation of the carotid baroreceptor region is one such option to lower blood pressure.
