= Fasciculus lateralis =

Fasciculus lateralis may refer to:

- Lateral cord (fasciculus lateralis plexus brachialis)
- Lateral proper fasciculus (fasciculus lateralis proprius)
- Lateral corticospinal tract (fasciculus cerebrospinalis lateralis)
