= Low pressure receptors =

Receptors sensing blood pressure

Low pressure baroreceptors or low pressure receptors are baroreceptors that relay information derived from blood pressure within the autonomic nervous system. They are stimulated by stretching of the vessel wall. They are located in large systemic veins and in the walls of the atria of the heart, and pulmonary vasculature. Low pressure baroreceptors are also referred to as volume receptors, cardiopulmonary baroreceptors, and veno-atrial stretch receptors.

== Structure ==
There are two types of cardiopulmonary baroreceptors, both of which are found within the atrial endocardium. Type A receptors are activated by wall tension, which occurs via atrial contraction during ventricular diastole. Type B receptors are activated by wall stretch, which occurs via atrial filling during ventricular systole. In the right atrium, the stretch receptors occur at the junction of the venae cavae. In the left atrium, the junction is at the pulmonary veins.

== Function ==
Low pressure baroreceptors are primarily involved in the regulation of the blood volume. Low pressure baroreceptors have both circulatory and renal effects, which produce changes in hormone secretion.

Stimulation of these receptors causes the atria to release atrial natriuretic peptide. This hormone acts on the kidneys to increase sodium excretion, which increases urine production and thereby leads to a decrease in blood pressure.

Through the vagal nerve, impulses transmits from the atria to the vagal center of the medulla. This causes a reduction in the sympathetic outflow the kidney, which results in decreased renal blood flow and decreased urine output. This same sympathetic outflow is increased to the sinoatrial node in the atria, which causes increased heart rate/cardiac output. These cardiopulmonary receptors also inhibits vagal stimulation in the vasoconstrictor center of the medulla resulting in decreased release of angiotensin, aldosterone, and vasopressin.

These receptors also cause a renal vasodilation, resulting in increased diuresis. This decreases the blood volume, resulting in the decrease of blood pressure.

== See also ==
- Renin–angiotensin system
- Bainbridge reflex
- High pressure receptors
- Atrial volume receptors
