= Proper fasciculi =

Groups of nerve fibers in the spinal cord

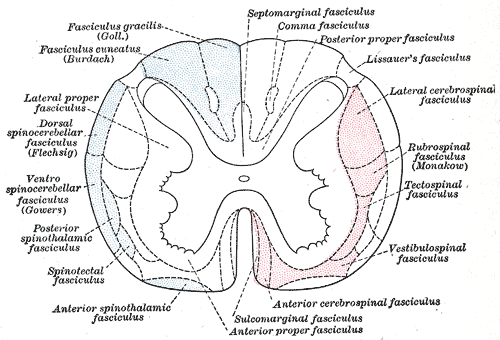
- Diagram of the principal fasciculi of the spinal cord.

Details
- Part of: Spinal cord

Identifiers
- Latin: fasciculi proprii

The proper fasciculi, or spinospinal fasciculi, or propriospinal tracts, are groups of short fibres, ascending and descending, and crossed and uncrossed, within the spinal cord. These fibres are grouped into anterior, posterior, and lateral regions and make up a spinal pathway. Descending dorsal root collaterals are often included in the pathway.

== Components ==
The anterior proper fasciculus consists of longitudinal intersegmental fibres which arise from cells in the grey matter, more especially from those of the medial group of the anterior column, and, after a longer or shorter course, re-enter the gray substance; and fibres which cross in the anterior white commissure from the grey matter of the opposite side.

The lateral proper fasciculus is made up of the remainder of the lateral column, and is continuous in front with the anterior proper fasciculus. It consists chiefly of intersegmental fibres which arise from cells in the grey matter, and, after a longer or shorter course, re-enter the grey matter and ramify in it. Some of its fibers are, also continued upward into the brain in the medial longitudinal fasciculus.

The posterior proper fasciculus arises from cells in the posterior column; their axons bifurcate (fork) into ascending and descending branches which occupy the ventral part of the funiculus close to the grey column. They are intersegmental and run for varying distances sending off collaterals and terminals to the grey matter.
