= Salomon Stricker =

Austrian pathologist and histologist

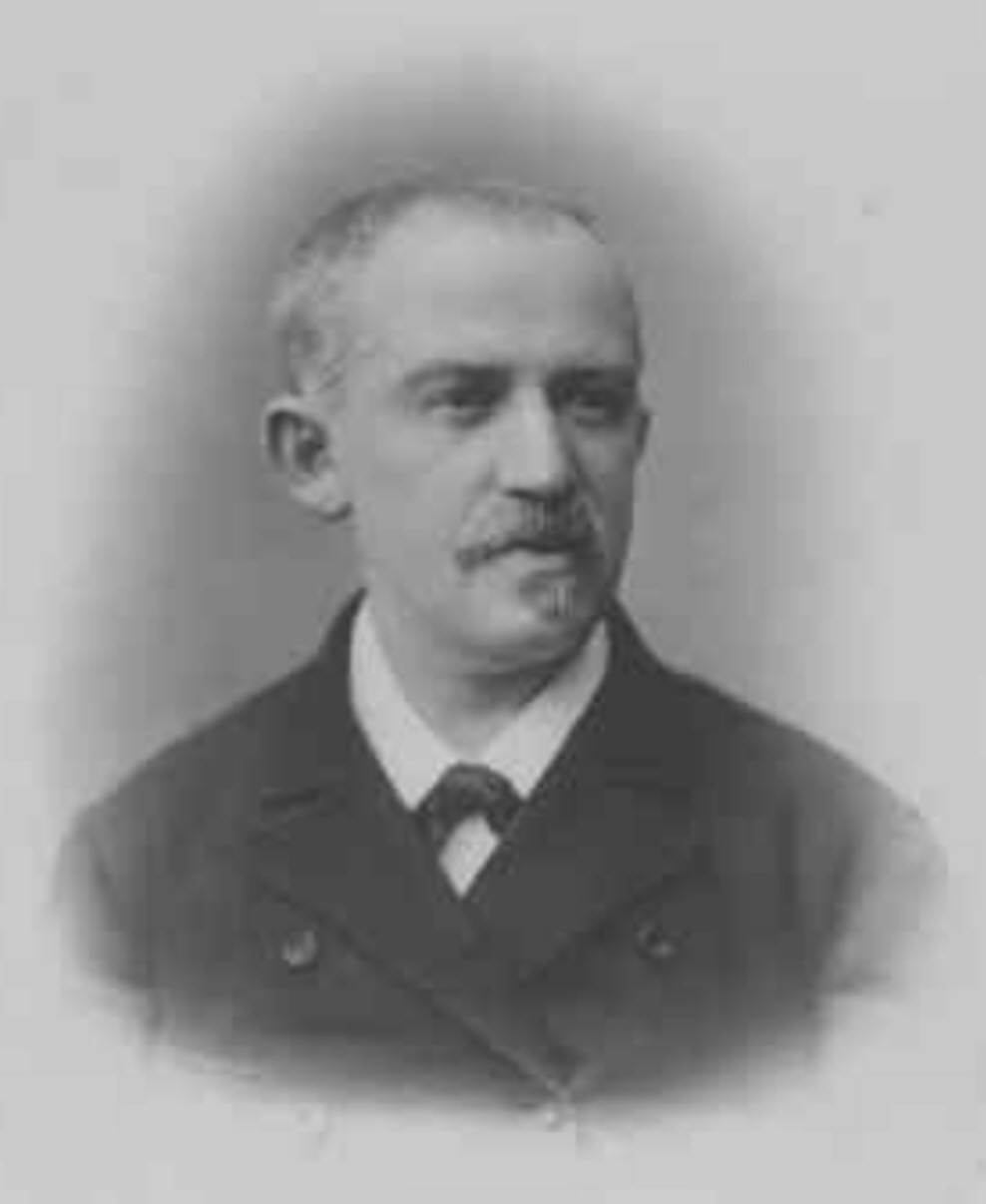
Salomon Stricker, photographed by Josef Löwy

Salomon Stricker (1 January 1834 – 2 April 1898) was a pathologist and histologist from the Austro-Hungarian Empire.

== Career ==
Stricker was born in Waag-Neustadtl (Hungarian: Vágújhely, now Nové Mesto nad Váhom, Slovakia). He studied at the University of Vienna, and subsequently became a research assistant at the Institute of Physiology under Ernst Wilhelm von Brücke. Later he became head of the Institute of General and Experimental Pathology in Vienna.

Stricker is remembered for his extensive studies in the fields of histology and experimental pathology, and is credited with making discoveries involving the diapedesis of erythrocytes and the contractility of vascular walls. He also made contributions in his research of cell division in vivo, on the histology of the cornea, and on the relationship of cells to the extracellular matrix.

Among his written works is the Handbuch der Lehre von den Geweben des Menschen und der Thiere, a two-volume textbook that contains Stricker's essays on histology, along with treatises from several other prominent physicians and scientists, such as Max Schultze, Wilhelm Kühne, Joseph von Gerlach, Siegmund Mayer, Heinrich Wilhelm Waldeyer, Theodor Meynert, Ewald Hering, et al. During its time, it was considered one of the greatest textbooks concerning histology. Stricker was also the author of a number of philosophical works.

In his landmark The Interpretation of Dreams, Sigmund Freud discusses a passage in Stricker's Studien über das Bewusstsein regarding the expression of affect in dreams (e.g. fear, joy) and the dream's ideational content, and how these two elements compare to the ideational/affective dynamic in an awake state. In his book, Stricker uses as an example: "If I am afraid of robbers in my dreams, the robbers, to be sure, are imaginary, but the fear of them is real". It was at Stricker's institute that ophthalmologist Karl Koller, at the suggestion of Freud, began his experimentation with cocaine as a local anaesthetic.

Stricker died in Vienna, aged 64.

== Selected publications ==
- Handbuch der Lehre von den Geweben des Menschen und der Thiere (Textbook on the doctrine of tissues of humans and animals), (1871–73)
- Vorlesungen über allgemeine und experimentelle Pathologie (Lectures on general and experimental pathology), (1877–83)
- Studien über das Bewusstsein (Studies on consciousness), (1879)
- Studien über die Sprachvorstellungen (Studies on language performances), (1880)
- Über die Bewegungsvorstellungen (1882)
- Studien über die Association der Vorstellungen (Studies on the association of ideas), 1883
- Physiologie des Rechts, (1884).

From 1871 to 1880, Stricker was editor of the Medicinischen Jahrbücher.
