= Substantia ferruginea =

Group of nerve cells in the brainstem

The substantia ferruginea is an underlying patch of deeply pigmented nerve cells located in the floor of the superior part of the sulcus limitans.

It was coined in 1838 and 1851.

== See also ==
- Rhomboid fossa
- Sulcus limitans
- Locus ceruleus
- Fourth ventricle
