= Vagal trigone =

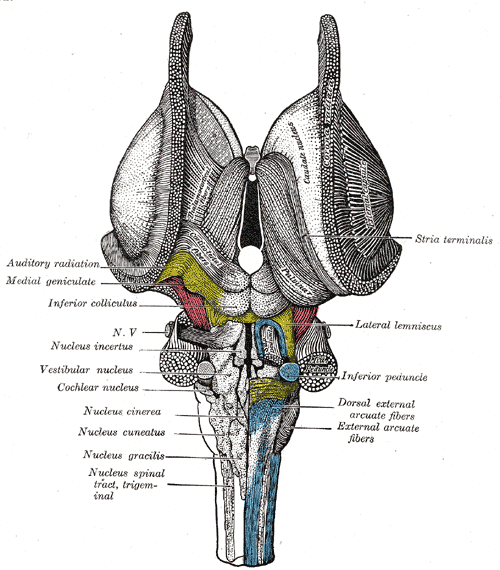
- Dissection of brain-stem. Dorsal view.

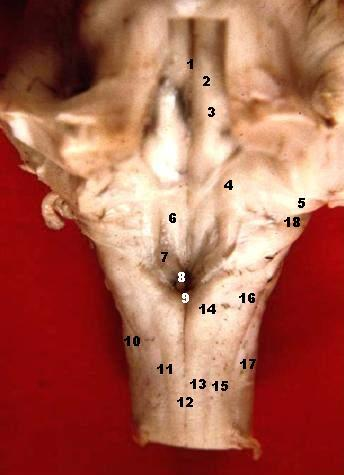
- Human caudal brainstem posterior view (trigonum nervi vagi is #7)

Details

Identifiers
- Latin: trigonum nervi vagi
- NeuroNames: 634
- TA98: A14.1.05.709
- FMA: 78445

The vagal trigone (ala cinerea) is a triangular eminence upon the rhomboid fossa produced by the underlying dorsal nucleus of vagus nerve.

The vagal trigone is separated from the area postrema by a narrow strip of thickened ependyma – the funiculus separans.

== See also ==
- Funiculus (neuroanatomy)
