= Francis Arthur Bainbridge =

English physiologist

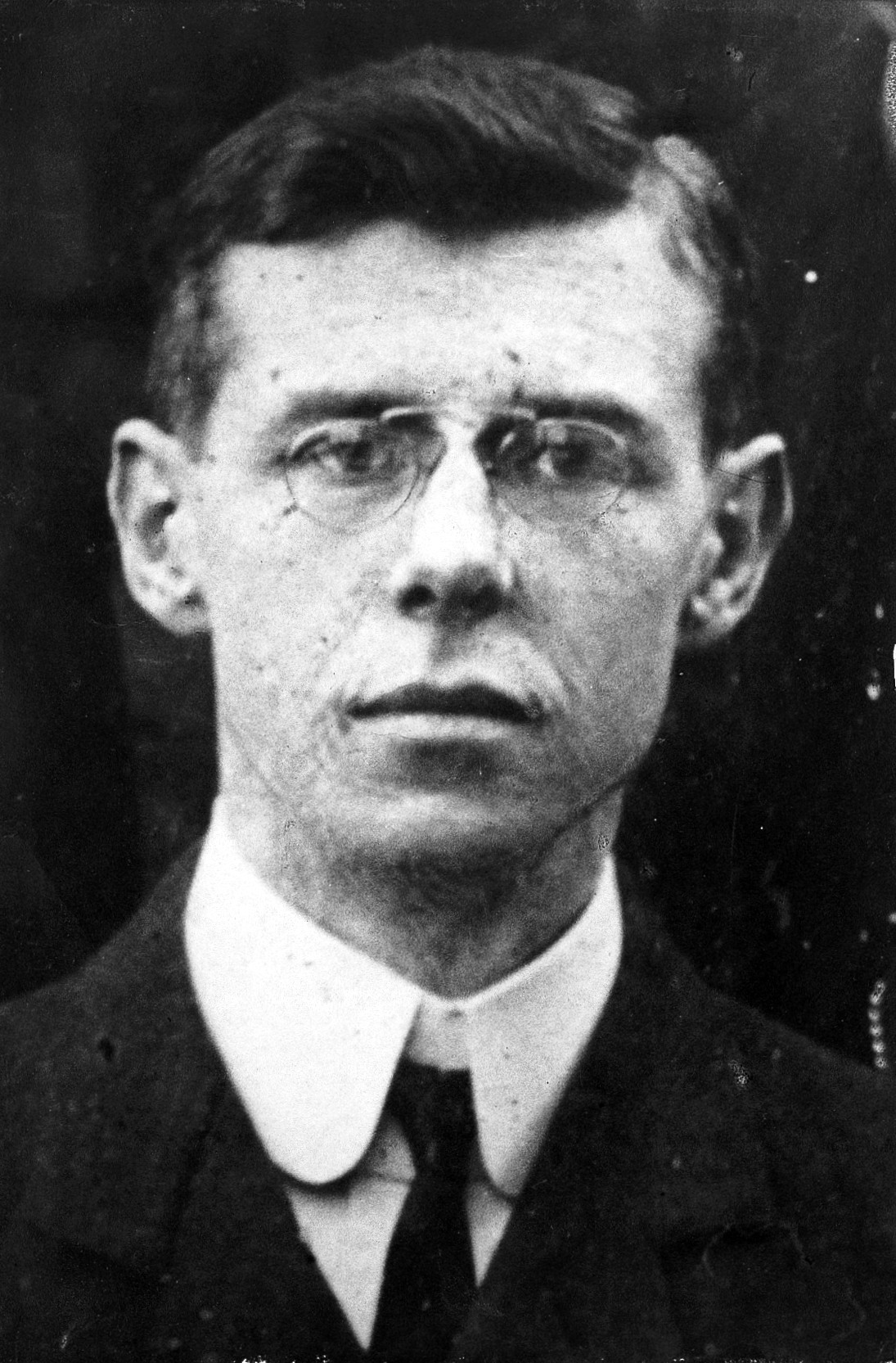
- Born: 29 July 1874; Stockton-on-Tees, England
- Died: 27 October 1921 (aged 47); London, England
- Occupation: Physiologist

Francis Arthur Bainbridge FRS FRCP (29 July 1874 – 27 October 1921) was an English physiologist. He is best known for discovering the Bainbridge (or atrial) reflex.

== History ==
Bainbridge was born in Stockton-on-Tees, County Durham, in 1874 and educated at The Leys School, Cambridge. He gained an entrance scholarship to Trinity College, Cambridge in 1893, where he studied physiology and obtained a first class in both parts of the natural science tripos in 1895 and 1896 and was awarded a BA Cantab in 1896. He then completed his medical training at St Bartholomew's Hospital, London and obtained a BSc from the University of London in 1897 and qualified in 1899. He received a M.B. from Cambridge University in 1901, and finally a doctorate (MA MD Cantab) in 1904. He was elected to a British Medical Association research fellowship in 1902 and received the Horton Smith prize for his MD thesis in 1904. Bainbridge did not want to practice medicine and there were no openings in physiology, so for a while he focused on pathology and bacteriology. In 1905, he became Gordon lecturer on pathology at Guy's Hospital, and began studies on urine secretion by the frog kidney. In 1907, he joined the staff of the Lister Institute of Preventive Medicine as a Jenner memorial student and then took a post as assistant bacteriologist. Over this period he undertook research in the physiological laboratories at University College London led by Ernest Starling and was appointed the Arris and Gale lecturer at the Royal College of Surgeons in 1908. His work on food-poisoning bacilli gained wide recognition, and was summarized in his 1912 Milroy lectures at the Royal College of Physicians. In 1911 he became a professor of physiology at Durham University. In 1915 he was appointed chair of physiology at St. Bartholomew's Hospital, where he continued to work for the rest of his life. During the first world war he served as a Royal Army Medical Corps captain, initially at Newcastle Military Hospital, and subsequently at Millbank, where he researched the effects of poison gases.

Bainbridge is best remembered for showing that an increase in pressure on the venous side of the heart resulted in an increased heart rate due to denervation of vagal influences to the heart. The eponymous "Bainbridge reflex" is named after him, being explained as an increased heart rate due to an increase of right atrial pressure. Bainbridge's findings contradicted "Marey's Law", a law that stated that an increase in blood pressure caused a lowering of the heart rate. Marey's Law was devised in 1861 by French physiologist Étienne-Jules Marey (1830–1904).

Bainbridge also made important contributions to the mechanisms responsible for lymph formation, the function of the gallbladder, the circulatory effects of exercise, as well as on filtration properties of the glomeruli in the kidneys. He also published a textbook on "Essentials of Physiology" with James Acworth Menzies (1914) and another on the "Physiology of Muscular Exercise" (1919).

He was elected a Fellow of the Royal Society in May 1919

== Personal life ==
He married Hilda Winifred Smith in 1905 and they had one daughter. He died in London on 27 October 1921.
