= Sinus arrhythmia =

Irregular heart rhythm originating in the sinus node

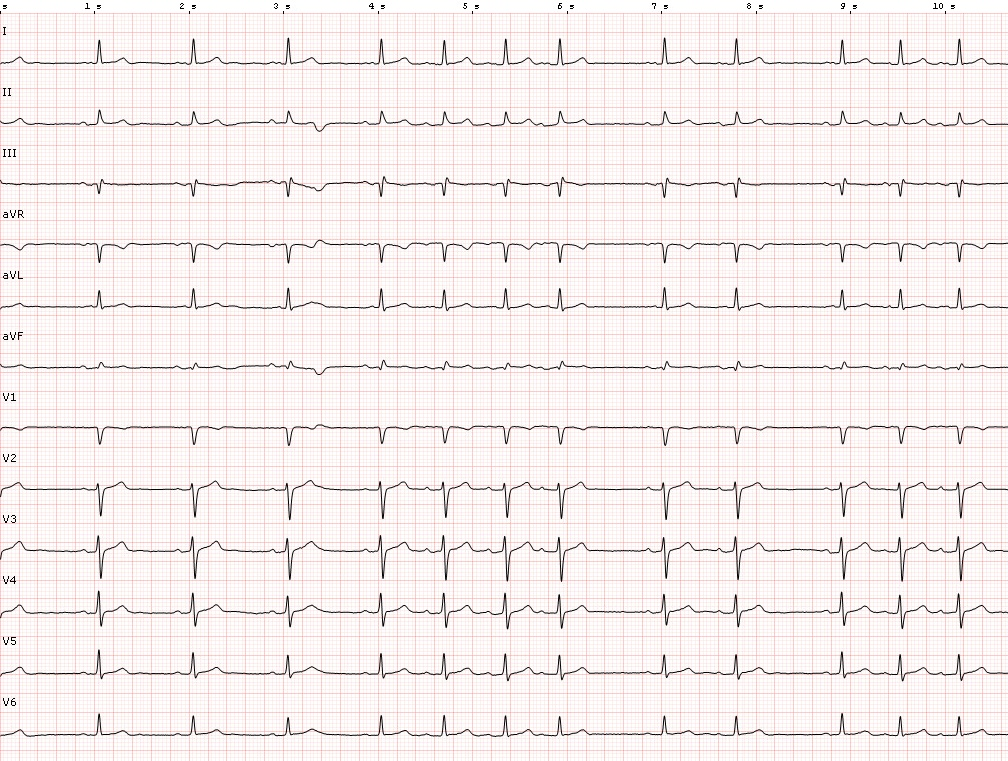
- ECG of a 67-year-old man with sinus arrhythmia, hypertension, diabetes and dyslipidemia.
- Specialty: Cardiology
- Diagnostic method: electrocardiogram

Sinus arrhythmia is a commonly encountered variation of normal sinus rhythm. Sinus arrhythmia characteristically presents with an irregular rate in which the variation in the R-R interval is more than 0.12 seconds (120 milliseconds). Additionally, P waves are typically mono-form and in a pattern consistent with atrial activation originating from the sinus node.

== Respiratory sinus arrhythmia ==
During respiration, the intermittent vagus nerve activation occurs, which results in beat to beat variations in the resting heart rate. During inspiration vagal tone is slowed down and the heart rate goes up (being maximal at the peak of inspiration), while during expiration vagal tone is increased and heart rate decreases, being slowest at end-expiration.

When present, respiratory sinus arrhythmia typically indicates good cardiovascular health and is more commonly seen in young healthy people, especially those with enhanced vagal tone or slower heart rates.

== See also ==
- Vagal tone
- Atrial fibrillation
