= Siegmund Mayer =

Siegmund Mayer (December 27, 1842 – September, 1910) was a German physiologist and histologist.

Mayer was born in Bechtheim in Rhenish Hesse. He studied at the Universities of Heidelberg, Giessen and Tübingen, where in 1865 he obtained his doctorate. He subsequently worked with Hermann Ludwig Ferdinand von Helmholtz (1821–1894) in Heidelberg, Carl Friedrich Wilhelm Ludwig (1816–1895) and Julius Friedrich Cohnheim (1839–1884) in Leipzig, and with Ernst Wilhelm von Brücke (1819–1892) in Vienna.

In 1869 he was habilitated for physiology at Vienna, and during the next year became Karl Ewald Konstantin Hering's assistant in Prague. In 1872 he became an associate professor and in 1887 a full professor. From 1880 he was director at the newly founded institute of histology.

Mayer made several important contributions particularly concerning the physiology of the heart and vessels, respiration and intestines. He was one of the first to describe chromaffin cells in the sympathetic nerve, and with Ewald Hering and Ludwig Traube, his name is associated with "Traube–Hering–Mayer waves", a phenomenon that deals with rhythmic variations in arterial blood pressure.

In addition to his scholarly papers published in scientific journals, he made contributions to Salomon Stricker's Handbuch der Lehre von den Geweben des Menschen und der Thiere (1872) and to Ludimar Hermann's Handbuch der Physiologie (1879). He was also author of Histologisches Taschenbuch (1887).

Mayer died September 1910 in Prague.

== Publications ==
- Studien zur Physiologie des Herzens und der Blutgefässe 6. Abhandlung: Über spontane Blutdruckschwankungen. Sitzungsberichte Akademie der Wissenschaften in Wien. Mathematisch-naturwissenschaftliche Classe, Anatomie, 1876, 74: 281–307
