= Bainbridge reflex =

Cardiovascular reflex

The Bainbridge reflex (or Bainbridge effect or atrial reflex) is a cardiovascular reflex causing an increase in heart rate in response to increased stretching of the wall of the right atrium and/or the inferior vena cava as a result of increased venous filling (i.e., increased preload). It is detected by stretch receptors in the wall of the right atrium, the afferent limb is via the vagus nerve, it is regulated by a center in the medulla oblongata of the brain, and the efferent limb involves reduced vagal activity and increased sympathetic nervous system outflow.

Mechanistically, the increased heart rate evoked by the Bainbridge reflex acts to match heart rate (and hence cardiac output) to effective circulating blood volume on a beat-to-beat basis. This, in combination with other cardiovascular reflexes, helps maintain homeostatic equilibrium of the circulation. The Bainbridge reflex may also contribute to respiratory sinus arrhythmia as intrathoracic pressure decreases during inspiration causing increased venous return.

The reflex is named after Francis Arthur Bainbridge, an English physiologist. The Bainbridge reflex was one of the first neural cardiovascular reflexes to be described and initiated a period of intense research into neural regulation of the heart.

== History and physiology ==
The reflex was originally demonstrated by Bainbridge in 1915 who observed an increase in heart rate following infusion of blood or saline into the jugular vein of anaesthetized dogs. The response was reduced by cutting the cardiac sympathetic nerves and abolished by cutting the vagus nerve and he therefore concluded that it was a neural reflex. While the reflex may raise heart rate by as much as 40% to 60%, initial attempts to replicate Bainbridge's observations were frequently unsuccessful and this inconsistency was only explained in 1955 when Coleridge and Linden found that the type of heart rate response (increase or decrease) depended on the resting heart rate and the rate of increase in volume. While Bainbridge only described an increase in heart rate in response to increased blood volume, a 'reverse Bainbridge reflex', namely a decrease in heart rate following reduced venous return has since been described.

The Bainbridge reflex and other cardiovascular reflexes, such as the arterial baroreceptor reflex and the Bezold-Jarisch reflex, influence heart rate and circulatory homeostasis. The Bainbridge reflex responds to increased blood volume, whereas the baroreceptor reflex responds to changes in arterial blood pressure and the Bezold-Jarisch reflex responds to mechanical and chemical stimuli acting on the left ventricular wall. These reflexes are supplemented by the intrinsic sensitivity to stretch of pacemaker cells in the sinoatrial node.

The Bainbridge reflex is most strong when heart rate is low; when heart rate is already high, additional venous return to the right atrium (i.e. additional increases in blood volume) will indirectly cause relatively greater stimulation of arterial baroreceptors which will reduce the heart rate. Thus, the effect of the Bainbridge reflex on heart rate may be counteracted by the baroreceptor reflex so that the net effect is determined by the balance of both reflexes, or, rather, the balance of factors determining their individual amplitude.

=== Mechanism ===
Increased blood volume in the right atrium leads to stretching of the atrial walls. This stretching is sensed by atrial stretch receptors (which are located at the venoatrial junction), causing an increase in the firing rate of group B nerve fibers (low pressure receptors). The information about the degree of atrial stretch is then conveyed through afferent fibres of the vagus nerve (cranial nerve X) to the medulla oblongata; efferents controlling heart rate (chronotropy) and contraction strength (inotropy) are then conveyed back to the heart through sympathetic nerves as well as the vagus nerve. Effects on cardiac contractility are insignificant and there are small increases in stroke volume and cardiac output that are accompanied by a reduction in peripheral resistance. The Bainbridge reflex is attenuated by both anticholinergics and beta-adrenergic receptor antagonists in innervated hearts (as one or the other afferent part of the reflex arc mediating the Bainbridge reflex is blocked), and can be entirely abolished by bilateral vagotomy (as the afferent portion of the reflex arc is entirely destroyed).

The Bainbridge reflex is the predominant, but not the only mechanism mediating increases in heart rate in response to increased atrial stretch: stretching of the pacemaker cells of the sinoatrial node has a direct positive chronotropic effect on the rate of the sinoatrial node. This local response involves stretch-activated ion channels, as was demonstrated by stretching single isolated pacemaker cells while recording their cellular electrical activity. This has led to the suggestion that the response discovered by Bainbridge should be referred to as an 'effect' rather than simply a 'reflex'.

== See also ==
- Low pressure receptor
- Atrial natriuretic peptide: When the atrium stretches, blood pressure is considered to be increased and sodium is excreted to lower blood pressure.
- Renin-angiotensin system: When the blood flow through the juxtaglomerular apparatus decreases, blood pressure is considered low, and the adrenal cortex secretes aldosterone to increase sodium reabsorption in the collecting duct, thereby increasing blood pressure.
- Baroreflex: When the stretch receptors in the aortic arch and carotid sinus are activated, for example by elevated blood pressure a reflex is initiated that decreases the heart rate to lower blood pressure.
- Bezold-Jarisch reflex
- Antidiuretic hormone: The hypothalamus detects the extracellular fluid hyperosmolality and the posterior pituitary gland secretes antidiuretic hormone to increase water reabsorption in the collecting duct.
