= Funiculus (neuroanatomy) =

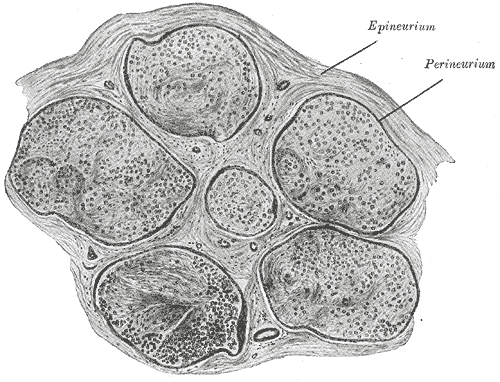
- Transverse section of human tibial nerve.

Identifiers
- TA98: A14.1.00.010
- FMA: 76738

A funiculus is a small bundle of axons (nerve fibres), enclosed by the perineurium. A small nerve may consist of a single funiculus, but a larger nerve will have several funiculi collected together into larger bundles known as fascicles. Fascicles are bound together in a common membrane, the epineurium.

Funiculi in the spinal cord are columns of white matter. Examples include:

- Anterior funiculus of the spinal cord
- Lateral funiculus of the spinal cord
- Posterior funiculus of the spinal cord

== See also ==
- Funiculus separans
