= Sulcus limitans =

Structure in the human brain

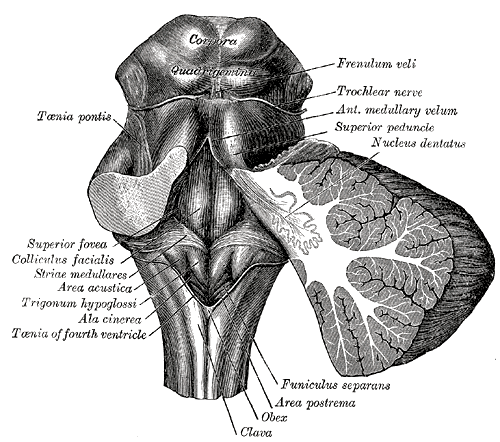
- Rhomboid fossa (sulcus limitans not labeled, but region is visible.)

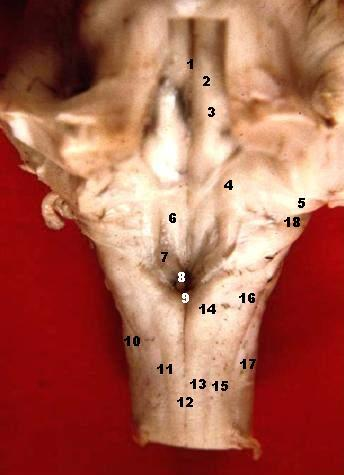
- Human caudal brainstem posterior view (The sulcus limitans separates #2 from #4.)

Details

Identifiers
- Latin: sulcus limitans fossae rhomboideae
- NeuroNames: 629

The sulcus limitans is a groove on either side of the midline in the rhomboid fossa. It separates the cranial nerve motor nuclei (located medial), and the sensory nuclei (located lateral). It is parallel to the median sulcus.
