= Heart rate turbulence =

Heart rate turbulence (HRT) is a baroreflex-mediated adjustment of heart rate which acts as a counter-mechanism to premature ventricular contraction (PVC). It consists of a brief speed-up in heart rate, followed by a slow decrease back to the baseline rate. PVCs can occur naturally in most otherwise-healthy adults, so measuring the characteristics of a given person's HRT can offer a non-invasive way to evaluate certain aspects of their cardiac or autonomic function without applying artificial external stimuli.

The measured values of HRT parameters have been shown to be a statistically significant prediction of the probability of dying from cardiac disease after a patient suffers a myocardial infarction. HRT can also be used to predict death in patients with congestive heart failure from a lethal arrhythmia.

== History ==
The concept of HRT was introduced to the medical community by Georg Schmidt and colleagues from the Technical University of Munich in 1999 in the British medical journal the Lancet. While studying PVC characteristics, Schmidt and his colleagues noticed that heart rate seemed to speed up after a PVC. To clarify, they listed the time from one heartbeat's R-wave to the next R-wave (called RR intervals) and synchronized these lists to the time of the PVC beat and averaged the values in the list. A plot of this averaged RR interval list (called a PVC tachogram) not only confirmed their observation that heart rate sped up for a few beats after a PVC, but highlighted another less obvious feature, that heart rate then slows down beyond what it was before the PVC, before returning to the original heart rate.

Schmidt reasoned that just as loss of variability in heart rate indicated patients more likely to be at high risk of dying after a heart attack, this phenomenon might also be an indicator of a healthy control of heart rate in such patients. They proceeded to test this hypothesis using 24-hour electrocardiogram (Holter monitor) recordings from one hundred survivors of heart attacks with frequent PVCs. Greater turbulence seemed correlated with better prognosis. They then used this data to determine the optimal discriminating threshold between normal and abnormal HRT values, and came up with the values TS=2.5, TO=0%. Now came the test. These thresholds were applied to Holter records from a total of 1191 patients who had experienced a heart attack. There were 162 deaths (13.6%) during the follow-up period of about two years. Patients with abnormal HRTs were approximately three-times more likely to die than those with normal HRTs, beating out some other commonly used predictors.

== Mechanism of HRT ==
HRT is widely considered to be a baroreflex phenomenon. A PVC interrupts the normal cardiac cycle, so the ventricles of the heart do not have time to fill up to their normal level, before contracting and pumping their contents out. This results in a pulse (blood pressure) weaker than expected and triggers normal homeostatic mechanisms that try to compensate by constricting arteries and increasing heart rate (the turbulence onset part of HRT). This is accomplished by the brain reflexively withdrawing the parasympathetic nerve signals and increasing the sympathetic nerve signals it sends to the heart. The compensatory constriction of the arteries and increased heart rate can cause blood pressure to overshoot normal values, triggering the opposite baroreflex. This time, the brain increases parasympathetic signalling and decreases sympathetic signalling, causing a decrease in heart rate (the turbulence slope part of HRT).

The exact quantitative contribution of the parasympathetic and sympathetic nervous flow to the heart to HRT is unknown. Some researchers assert that HRT is solely dependent upon parasympathetic activity because atropine, a parasympathetic activity blocker abolishes HRT while a beta-blocker (sympathetic blocker) has no effect on HRT. The contribution of the compensatory pause, the pause between the PVC and the next normal beat, to HRT is also unknown. Whether the single beat blood pressure increase after a compensatory pause occurs in both normal and compromised hearts as well is at present uncertain. To date, no physiological parameter has been linked in a quantitative manner to turbulence slope, whereas turbulence onset was shown by researchers in Calgary, Canada, to be linearly dependent upon duration of subnormal blood pressure in a well designed experiment.

The reason that the size of HRT after a PVC can be used as a predictor of cardiac death is suggested by its mechanism. Parasympathetic nervous activity to the heart is believed to be protective and sympathetic nervous activity, deleterious, to the heart. Especially after a heart attack, sympathetic nervous activity tends to be increased. A healthy HRT indicates the presence of a healthy amount of parasympathetic activity, countering sympathetic activity. To take a wider view, however, it may be that a healthy HRT is also an indication of a healthy brain, and is the reason a small HRT also predicts a likelihood of death from non-cardiac causes as well as from cardiac causes.

== See also ==
- Heart rate variability
