= Carotid sinus =

Dilated area near internal carotid artery above bifurcation

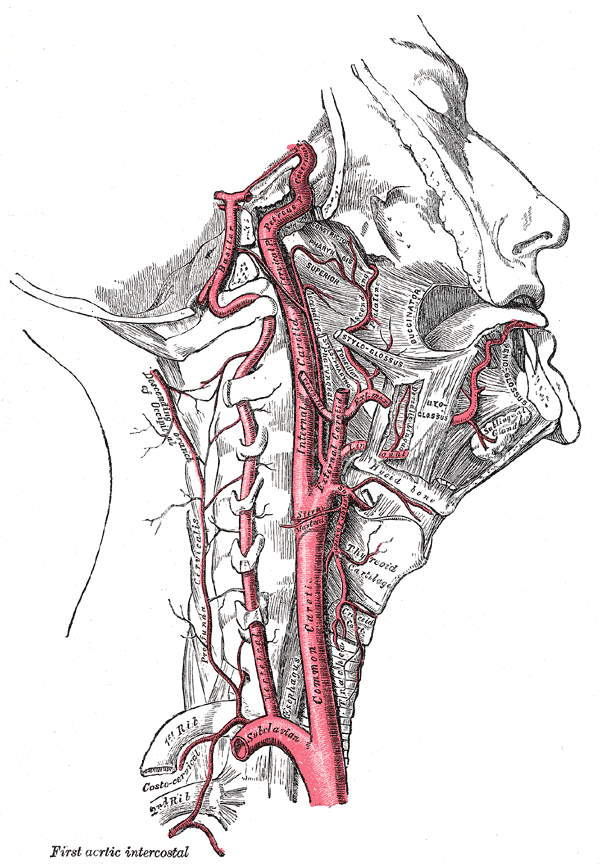
- Arteries of the neck. The carotid sinus is at the origin of the internal carotid artery.

Details
- Artery: Carotid artery
- Nerve: Branch of glossopharyngeal nerve to carotid sinus

Identifiers
- Latin: sinus caroticus
- MeSH: D002346
- TA98: A12.2.04.008; A12.2.06.003
- TA2: 4367
- FMA: 50094

In human anatomy, the carotid sinus is a dilated area at the base of the internal carotid artery just superior to the bifurcation of the internal carotid and external carotid at the level of the superior border of thyroid cartilage. The carotid sinus extends from the bifurcation to the "true" internal carotid artery. The carotid sinuses are sensitive to pressure changes in the arterial blood at this level. They are two out of the four baroreception sites in humans and most mammals.

== Structure ==
The carotid sinus is the reflex area of the carotid artery, consisting of baroreceptors which monitor blood pressure.

== Function ==
The carotid sinus contains numerous baroreceptors which function as a "sampling area" for many homeostatic mechanisms for maintaining blood pressure. The carotid sinus baroreceptors are innervated by the carotid sinus nerve, which is a branch of the glossopharyngeal nerve (CN IX). The neurons which innervate the carotid sinus centrally project to the solitary nucleus in the medulla of the brainstem. The solitary nucleus indirectly modulates the activity of sympathetic and parasympathetic neurons in the medulla and pons through the hypothalamus. These neurons then regulate the autonomic control of the heart and blood vessels. The aortic arch baroreceptors are innervated by the aortic nerve (nerve of Cyon, Ludwig nerve), which combines with CN X (vagus nerve) and travels to the NTS.

== Clinical significance ==
It is a sensitive site of the body because stimulation can drive large-scale reflex effects throughout the body. This can be used therapeutically in treatment of resistant hypertension by baroreflex activation. Physical assault at this point, producing massive baroreflex activation can cause dramatic falls in blood pressure and cerebral ischemia. This is the mechanism of baroreflex activation therapy.

=== Disease ===
The carotid sinus often has atherosclerotic plaques because of disturbed hemodynamics (low wall shear stress, flow reversal/recirculation). Since these plaques, if large and unstable, predispose to ischemic strokes and transient ischemic attacks, carotid endarterectomies are frequently done for prophylaxis.

==== Carotid sinus hypersensitivity ====
The carotid sinus baroreceptor can be oversensitive to manual stimulation from the pressure applied at the carotid sinus at the carotid bifurcation. It is a condition known as 'carotid sinus hypersensitivity' (CSH), 'carotid sinus syndrome' or 'carotid sinus syncope', in which manual stimulation causes large changes in heart rate and blood pressure, which can result in bradycardia, vasodilation, and hypotension. This classically presents as a patient who has "fainted" (actually a presyncope) on several occasions while shaving, or in some other way coming into contact with their carotid sinus. Denervation is performed as treatment for this.

Usually older patients with syncope and unexplained falls often have coexisting conditions such as carotid sinus hypersensitivity, orthostatic hypotension, and vasovagal syncope.

==== Carotid sinus syndrome ====
Carotid sinus syndrome (CSS) is a temporary loss of consciousness that sometimes accompanies convulsive seizures because of the intensity of the carotid sinus reflex when pressure builds in one or both carotid sinuses.

=== Treatment of resistant hypertension ===
Stimulation of baroreceptors at the carotid sinus can be used to treat resistant hypertension via activation of the baroreflex. A pacemaker-like device can be implanted to electrically stimulate the receptors chronically, which is found to lower blood pressure by 15–25 mmHg.

=== Massage ===
Massage of the carotid sinus, carotid sinus massage is used to diagnose carotid sinus syncope and is sometimes useful for differentiating supraventricular tachycardia (SVT) from ventricular tachycardia. Like the valsalva maneuver, it is a treatment for acute SVT. It is less effective than pharmaceutical management of SVT with verapamil or adenosine, but it is still the preferred first line of treatment in a hemodynamically stable patient.

=== Carotid sinus reflex death ===
Carotid sinus reflex death is a potential etiology of sudden death in which manual stimulation of the carotid sinus allegedly causes strong glossopharyngeal nerve (Vagus nerve is for aortic arch baroreceptors) impulses leading to terminal cardiac arrest. Carotid sinus reflex death has been pointed out as a possible cause of death in cases of strangulation, hanging and autoerotic strangulation, but such deductions remain controversial. Medical literature examining the use of carotid sinus massage involving brief gentle pressure of the carotid sinus in therapeutic settings as a diagnostic and therapeutic examination tool have reported few potentially fatal complications. A carotid massage can also possibly dislodge a thrombus, or some plaque. This could lead to any number of life-threatening effects, including stroke.

== In martial arts and self defense ==
Stimulation of the carotid sinus via a slap or a strike, to induce (usually temporary, but sometimes lethal) loss of consciousness is a self-defense technique, and is often taught in martial arts such as karate.

== See also ==
- Baroreflex
- Carotid body

== Additional images ==
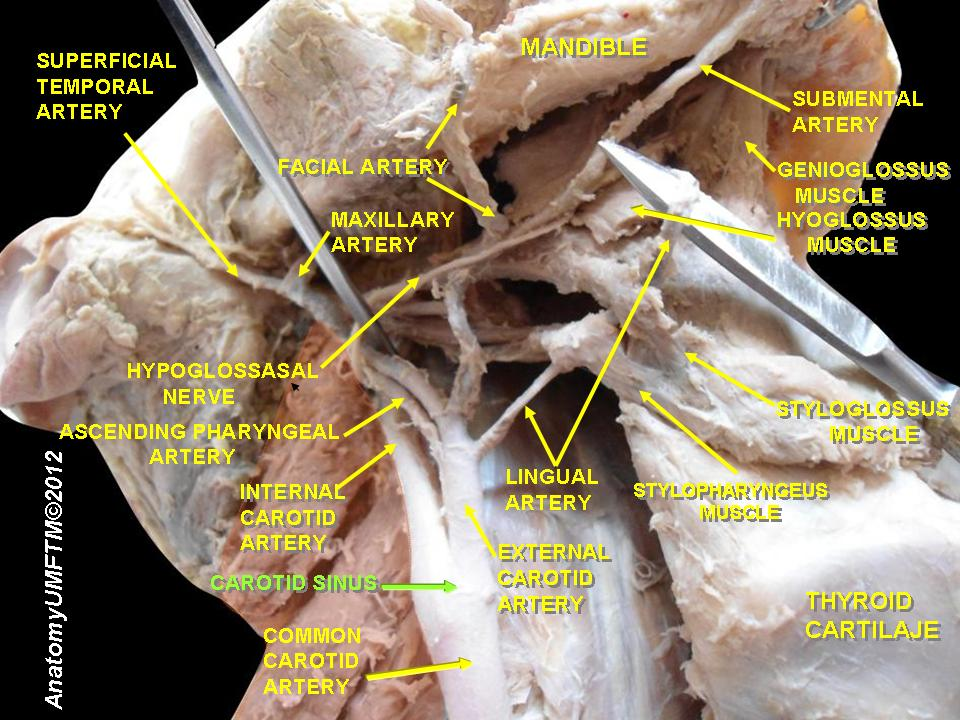
Carotid sinus
