= Humoral factor =

Factors that are transported by the circulatory system

Humoral factors are factors that are transported by the circulatory system, that is, in blood, and include:

- Humoral immunity factors in the immune system
- Hormones in the endocrine system

Humoral immunity factors act primarily locally and produce inflammation. Examples of these include prostaglandins and histamine. Hormones act more broadly and include homoral factors such as adrenaline and vasopressin.
