= Baroreceptor =

Sensors detecting blood pressure

Baroreceptors (or archaically, pressoreceptors) are stretch receptors that sense blood vessel deformation. The term "baroreceptors" is somewhat a misnomer, since they detect stretch rather than pressure directly. Increases in vessel diameter triggers increased action potential generation rates and provides information to the central nervous system. This sensory information is used primarily in autonomic reflexes that in turn influence cardiac output and vascular smooth muscle to influence vascular resistance. Baroreceptors act immediately as part of a negative feedback system called the baroreflex as soon as there is a change from the usual mean arterial blood pressure, returning the pressure toward a normal level. These reflexes help regulate short-term blood pressure. The solitary nucleus in the medulla oblongata of the brain recognizes changes in the firing rate of action potentials from the baroreceptors, and influences cardiac output and systemic vascular resistance.

Baroreceptors can be divided into two categories based on the type of blood vessel in which they are located: arterial baroreceptors and low-pressure baroreceptors (also known as cardiopulmonary or volume receptors).

== Arterial baroreceptors ==
Arterial baroreceptors are located in the carotid sinus (at the bifurcation of common carotid artery into external and internal carotids) and in the aortic arch. The baroreceptors can identify the changes in both the average blood pressure or the rate of change in pressure with each arterial pulse. Action potentials triggered in the baroreceptor ending are then directly conducted to the brainstem where central terminations (synapses) transmit this information to neurons within the solitary nucleus which lies in the medulla. Reflex responses from such baroreceptor activity can trigger increases or decreases in the heart rate. Arterial baroreceptor sensory endings are simple, splayed nerve endings that lie in the tunica adventitia of the artery. An increase in the mean arterial pressure increases depolarization of these sensory endings, which results in action potentials. These action potentials are conducted to the solitary nucleus in the central nervous system by axons and have a reflex effect on the cardiovascular system through autonomic neurons. Hormone secretions that target the heart and blood vessels are affected by the stimulation of baroreceptors.

At normal resting blood pressures, baroreceptors discharge with each heart beat. If blood pressure falls, such as on orthostatic hypotension or in hypovolaemic shock, baroreceptor firing rate decreases and baroreceptor reflexes act to help restore blood pressure by increasing heart rate. Signals from the carotid baroreceptors are sent via the glossopharyngeal nerve (cranial nerve IX). Signals from the aortic baroreceptors travel through the vagus nerve (cranial nerve X). Carotid sinus baroreceptors are responsive to both increases or decreases in arterial pressure, while aortic arch baroreceptors are only responsive to increases in arterial pressure. Arterial baroreceptors inform reflexes about arterial blood pressure but other stretch receptors in the large veins and right atrium convey information about the low pressure parts of the circulatory system.

Baroreceptors respond very quickly to maintain a stable blood pressure, but their responses diminish with time and thus are most effective for conveying short term changes in blood pressure. In people with essential hypertension the baroreceptors and their reflexes change and function to maintain the elevated blood pressure as if normal. The receptors then become less sensitive to change.

Electrical stimulation of baroreceptors has been found to activate the baroreflex, reducing sympathetic tone throughout the body and thereby reducing blood pressure in patients with resistant hypertension.

== Low-pressure baroreceptors ==
The low-pressure baroreceptors are found in large systemic veins, in pulmonary vessels, and in the walls of the right atrium and ventricles of the heart (the atrial volume receptors). The low-pressure baroreceptors are involved with the regulation of blood volume. The blood volume determines the mean pressure throughout the system, in particular in the venous side where most of the blood is held.

The low-pressure baroreceptors have both circulatory and renal effects; they produce changes in hormone secretion, resulting in profound effects on the retention of salt and water; they also influence intake of salt and water. The renal effects allow the receptors to change the long-term mean pressure in the system.

== Baroreceptor dysfunction ==
Baroreceptors are integral to the body's function, as pressure changes in the blood vessels would not be detected as quickly in the absence of baroreceptors. When baroreceptors are not working, blood pressure continues to increase, but within an hour, the blood pressure returns to normal as other blood pressure regulatory systems take over.

Baroreceptors can also become oversensitive in some people (usually the carotid baroreceptors in older males). This can lead to bradycardia, dizziness and fainting (syncope) from touching the neck (often whilst shaving). This is an important cause to exclude in men having pre-syncope or syncope symptoms.
