= List of MeSH codes (A07) =

The following is a partial list of the "A" codes for Medical Subject Headings (MeSH), as defined by the United States National Library of Medicine (NLM).

This list continues the information at List of MeSH codes (A06). Codes following these are found at List of MeSH codes (A08). For other MeSH codes, see List of MeSH codes.

The source for this content is the set of MeSH Trees from the NLM.

== MeSH A07 – cardiovascular system ==
=== MeSH A07.231 – blood vessels ===
==== MeSH A07.015.114 – arteries ====
- MeSH A07.231.114.056 – aorta
- MeSH A07.231.114.056.205 – aorta, abdominal
- MeSH A07.231.114.056.372 – aorta, thoracic
- MeSH A07.231.114.056.847 – sinus of valsalva
- MeSH A07.231.114.060 – arterioles
- MeSH A07.231.114.085 – axillary artery
- MeSH A07.231.114.106 – basilar artery
- MeSH A07.231.114.139 – brachial artery
- MeSH A07.231.114.145 – brachiocephalic trunk
- MeSH A07.231.114.158 – bronchial arteries
- MeSH A07.231.114.186 – carotid arteries
- MeSH A07.231.114.186.200 – carotid artery, common
- MeSH A07.231.114.186.200.210 – carotid artery, external
- MeSH A07.231.114.186.200.230 – carotid artery, internal
- MeSH A07.231.114.186.456 – carotid sinus
- MeSH A07.231.114.207 – celiac artery
- MeSH A07.231.114.228 – cerebral arteries
- MeSH A07.231.114.228.100 – anterior cerebral artery
- MeSH A07.231.114.228.351 – circle of willis
- MeSH A07.231.114.228.550 – middle cerebral artery
- MeSH A07.231.114.228.700 – posterior cerebral artery
- MeSH A07.231.114.228.868 – temporal arteries
- MeSH A07.231.114.248 – ciliary arteries
- MeSH A07.231.114.269 – coronary vessels
- MeSH A07.231.114.330 – epigastric arteries
- MeSH A07.231.114.351 – femoral artery
- MeSH A07.231.114.365 – gastric artery
- MeSH A07.231.114.379 – gastroepiploic artery
- MeSH A07.231.114.407 – hepatic artery
- MeSH A07.231.114.444 – iliac artery
- MeSH A07.231.114.523 – maxillary artery
- MeSH A07.231.114.545 – meningeal arteries
- MeSH A07.231.114.565 – mesenteric arteries
- MeSH A07.231.114.565.510 – mesenteric artery, inferior
- MeSH A07.231.114.565.755 – mesenteric artery, superior
- MeSH A07.231.114.622 – ophthalmic artery
- MeSH A07.231.114.681 – popliteal artery
- MeSH A07.231.114.715 – pulmonary artery
- MeSH A07.231.114.740 – radial artery
- MeSH A07.231.114.745 – renal artery
- MeSH A07.231.114.765 – retinal artery
- MeSH A07.231.114.814 – splenic artery
- MeSH A07.231.114.839 – subclavian artery
- MeSH A07.231.114.891 – thoracic arteries
- MeSH A07.231.114.891.525 – mammary arteries
- MeSH A07.231.114.895 – tibial arteries
- MeSH A07.231.114.920 – ulnar artery
- MeSH A07.231.114.929 – umbilical arteries
- MeSH A07.231.114.940 – uterine artery
- MeSH A07.231.114.955 – vertebral artery

==== MeSH A07.015.461 – microvessels ====
- MeSH A07.015.461.080 – arterioles
- MeSH A07.015.461.085 – arteriovenous anastomosis
- MeSH A07.015.461.165 – capillaries
- MeSH A07.015.461.920 – venules

==== MeSH A07.015.611 – retinal vessels ====
- MeSH A07.015.611.647 – retinal artery
- MeSH A07.015.611.773 – retinal vein

==== MeSH A07.015.700 – tunica intima ====
- MeSH A07.015.700.500 – endothelium, vascular
- MeSH A07.015.700.750 – pericytes

==== MeSH A07.015.733 – tunica media ====
- MeSH A07.015.733.500 – muscle, smooth, vascular

==== MeSH A07.231.908 – veins ====
- MeSH A07.015.908.077 – axillary vein
- MeSH A07.015.908.106 – azygos vein
- MeSH A07.015.908.130 – brachiocephalic veins
- MeSH A07.015.908.155 – cerebral veins
- MeSH A07.015.908.194 – coronary vessels
- MeSH A07.015.908.194.500 – coronary vessels
- MeSH A07.015.908.224 – cranial sinuses
- MeSH A07.015.908.224.334 – cavernous sinus
- MeSH A07.015.908.224.667 – superior sagittal sinus
- MeSH A07.015.908.224.833 – transverse sinus
- MeSH A07.231.908.314 – femoral vein
- MeSH A07.231.908.380 – hepatic veins
- MeSH A07.231.908.427 – iliac vein
- MeSH A07.231.908.498 – jugular veins
- MeSH A07.231.908.641 – popliteal vein
- MeSH A07.231.908.670 – portal system
- MeSH A07.231.908.670.385 – mesenteric veins
- MeSH A07.231.908.670.567 – portal vein
- MeSH A07.231.908.670.730 – splenic vein
- MeSH A07.231.908.670.874 – umbilical veins
- MeSH A07.231.908.713 – pulmonary veins
- MeSH A07.231.908.752 – renal veins
- MeSH A07.231.908.783 – retinal vein
- MeSH A07.231.908.819 – saphenous vein
- MeSH A07.231.908.877 – subclavian vein
- MeSH A07.231.908.949 – venae cavae
- MeSH A07.231.908.949.648 – vena cava, inferior
- MeSH A07.231.908.949.815 – vena cava, superior
- MeSH A07.015.908.950 – venous valves
- MeSH A07.015.908.952 – venules

=== MeSH A07.541 – heart ===
==== MeSH A07.541.278 – fetal heart ====
- MeSH A07.541.278.395 – ductus arteriosus
- MeSH A07.541.278.930 – truncus arteriosus

==== MeSH A07.541.358 – heart atria ====
- MeSH A07.541.358.100 – atrial appendage

==== MeSH A07.541.409 – heart conduction system ====
- MeSH A07.541.409.147 – atrioventricular node
- MeSH A07.541.409.273 – bundle of his
- MeSH A07.541.409.683 – purkinje fibers
- MeSH A07.541.409.819 – sinoatrial node

==== MeSH A07.541.459 – heart septum ====
- MeSH A07.541.459.249 – atrial septum
- MeSH A07.541.459.374 – endocardial cushions
- MeSH A07.541.459.500 – foramen ovale
- MeSH A07.541.459.750 – ventricular septum

==== MeSH A07.541.510 – heart valves ====
- MeSH A07.541.510.110 – aortic valve
- MeSH A07.541.510.240 – chordae tendineae
- MeSH A07.541.510.507 – mitral valve
- MeSH A07.541.510.619 – papillary muscles
- MeSH A07.541.510.738 – pulmonary valve
- MeSH A07.541.510.893 – tricuspid valve

==== MeSH A07.541.704 – myocardium ====
- MeSH A07.541.704.500 – myoblasts, cardiac
- MeSH A07.541.704.570 – myocytes, cardiac
- MeSH A07.541.704.750 – papillary muscles

==== MeSH A07.541.795 – pericardium ====
- MeSH A07.541.795.500 – pericardial fluid

The list continues at List of MeSH codes (A08).
