= List of MeSH codes (A06) =

The following is a partial list of the "A" codes for Medical Subject Headings (MeSH), as defined by the United States National Library of Medicine (NLM).

This list continues the information at List of MeSH codes (A05). Codes following these are found at List of MeSH codes (A07). For other MeSH codes, see List of MeSH codes.

The source for this content is the set of 2006 MeSH Trees from the NLM.

== MeSH A06 – endocrine system ==
=== MeSH A06.224 – chromaffin system ===
- MeSH A06.224.161 – chromaffin cells
- MeSH A06.224.207 – chromaffin granules
- MeSH A06.224.358 – enterochromaffin cells
- MeSH A06.224.365 – enterochromaffin-like cells
- MeSH A06.224.636 – para-aortic bodies
- MeSH A06.224.736 – paraganglia, chromaffin

=== MeSH A06.390 – enteroendocrine cells ===
- MeSH A06.390.021 – enterochromaffin cells
- MeSH A06.390.043 – enterochromaffin-like cells
- MeSH A06.390.065 – gastrin-secreting cells
- MeSH A06.390.087 – glucagon-secreting cells
- MeSH A06.390.131 – insulin-secreting cells
- MeSH A06.390.650 – pancreatic polypeptide-secreting cells
- MeSH A06.390.825 – somatostatin-secreting cells

=== MeSH A06.407 – endocrine glands ===
- MeSH A06.407.071 – adrenal glands
- MeSH A06.407.071.140 – adrenal cortex
- MeSH A06.407.071.140.950 – zona fasciculata
- MeSH A06.407.071.140.960 – zona glomerulosa
- MeSH A06.407.071.140.970 – zona reticularis
- MeSH A06.407.071.265 – adrenal medulla
- MeSH A06.407.312 – gonads
- MeSH A06.407.312.497 – ovary
- MeSH A06.407.312.497.278 – corpus luteum
- MeSH A06.407.312.497.278.400 – luteal cells
- MeSH A06.407.312.497.535 – ovarian follicle
- MeSH A06.407.312.497.535.150 – follicular fluid
- MeSH A06.407.312.497.535.300 – granulosa cells
- MeSH A06.407.312.497.535.600 – theca cells
- MeSH A06.407.312.782 – testis
- MeSH A06.407.312.782.513 – leydig cells
- MeSH A06.407.414 – islets of langerhans
- MeSH A06.407.414.043 – glucagon-secreting cells
- MeSH A06.407.414.087 – insulin-secreting cells
- MeSH A06.407.414.587 – pancreatic polypeptide-secreting cells
- MeSH A06.407.414.793 – somatostatin-secreting cells
- MeSH A06.407.560 – parathyroid glands
- MeSH A06.407.635 – pineal gland
- MeSH A06.407.691 – pituitary-adrenal system
- MeSH A06.407.747 – pituitary gland
- MeSH A06.407.747.608 – pituitary gland, anterior
- MeSH A06.407.747.734 – pituitary gland, posterior
- MeSH A06.407.900 – thyroid gland

=== MeSH A06.688 – neurosecretory systems ===
- MeSH A06.688.357 – hypothalamo-hypophyseal system
- MeSH A06.688.357.500 – median eminence
- MeSH A06.688.357.750 – pituitary gland
- MeSH A06.688.357.750.700 – pituitary gland, anterior
- MeSH A06.688.357.750.734 – pituitary gland, posterior
- MeSH A06.688.733 – pineal gland

The list continues at List of MeSH codes (A07).
