= Nipple reconstruction surgery =

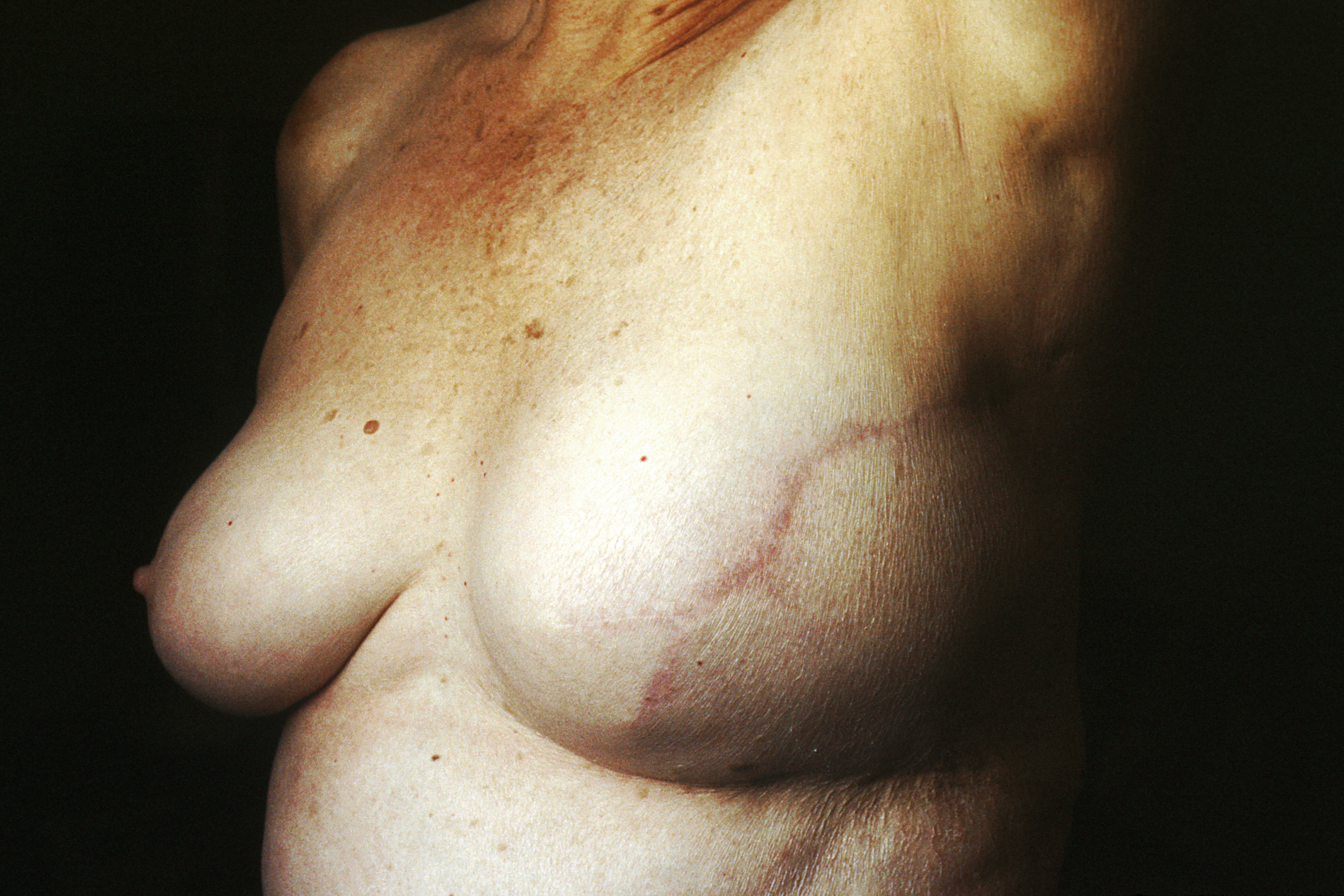
Breast reconstruction following a mastectomy. As a result of the mastectomy, patients lose one or both of their nipples. A NAC reconstruction can be performed to recreate a nipple and areola on the reconstructed breast. Image from the National Cancer Institute, photographed by Linda Bartlett.

Nipple reconstruction, specifically nipple-areola complex (NAC) reconstruction, is a procedure commonly done for patients who had part or all of their nipple removed for medical reasons. For example, NAC reconstruction can apply to breast cancer patients who underwent a mastectomy, the surgical removal of a breast. NAC reconstruction can also be applied to patients with trauma, burn injuries, and congenital or pathological abnormalities in nipple development.

The visual appearance of the NAC, including its relative position, size, color, shape, and texture, varies between individuals. Therefore, aesthetics is an important consideration when surgeons reconstruct the NAC to ensure it appears natural and pleasing to the patient. There are different methods for NAC reconstruction; however, in general, the procedure is safe and can be performed under local anesthesia.

== Development of NAC reconstruction techniques ==
Throughout history, different methods for NAC reconstruction have been proposed and implicated.

=== Composite graft reconstruction ===
In 1949, Adams used a composite graft from the labia minora, which is the skin surrounding the vagina, to create the first reconstructed NAC.

=== Nipple sharing ===
In 1972, Millard described a new method called "nipple sharing". In this method, a split-skin graft from the patient's contralateral nipple is used to reconstruct a new nipple. This method was commonly used as it was often successful in achieving matching pigment and texture between the reconstructed nipple and the contralateral nipple. However, it still has risks of infection, pain, numbness, scarring, and depigmentation. Nipple sharing may still be conducted today for patients with nipples that are taller than 1 cm in height.

=== Flap-based techniques ===
In the 1980s, flap-based techniques for reconstruction became increasingly popular. Such techniques involve incising a small flap of skin on the patient's breast, and raising the flap so it forms a shape that resembles a nipple. In general, a reconstructed nipple tends to gradually shrink over time. However, an advantage of flap-based techniques is that surgeons can construct a nipple that is slightly taller than normal, to counteract the inevitable shrinking of the reconstructed nipple.

=== Tissue engineering and regenerative medicine ===
In the 21st century, advancements in tissue engineering and regenerative medicine hold the potential in developing techniques for nipple reconstruction. For instance, tissue engineering and regenerative medicine can help researchers develop suitable and safe nipple implants.

== Impact on patient well-being ==
Regardless of the technique used for NAC reconstruction, the main goal is to recreate a normal appearance of the breasts and therefore bring satisfaction to the patient. Therefore, the ultimate aim of NAC reconstruction is to benefit the well-being of the patient.

NAC reconstruction has shown to have positive psychological effects on patients, especially to those who have undergone a mastectomy. These patients have to get their breast glandular tissue completely removed, resulting in the surgical removal of their breasts. Post-procedure, patients might suffer from body image issues, sexual dysfunction, and low self-esteem. NAC reconstruction has been shown to reduce the psychological impacts that patients might face following a mastectomy. This is especially the case for female patients, as the breasts play a key role in the female identity. NAC reconstruction has reportedly empowered female patients by improving their body image and helping them overcome the psychological challenges from having breast cancer.

Moreover, NAC reconstruction has been shown to positively influence a patient's body image. A study indicated that patients who had both NAC reconstruction and breast reconstruction saw improvements in the overall appearance and sensation of their breasts.

== Anatomy of the nipple-areola complex ==
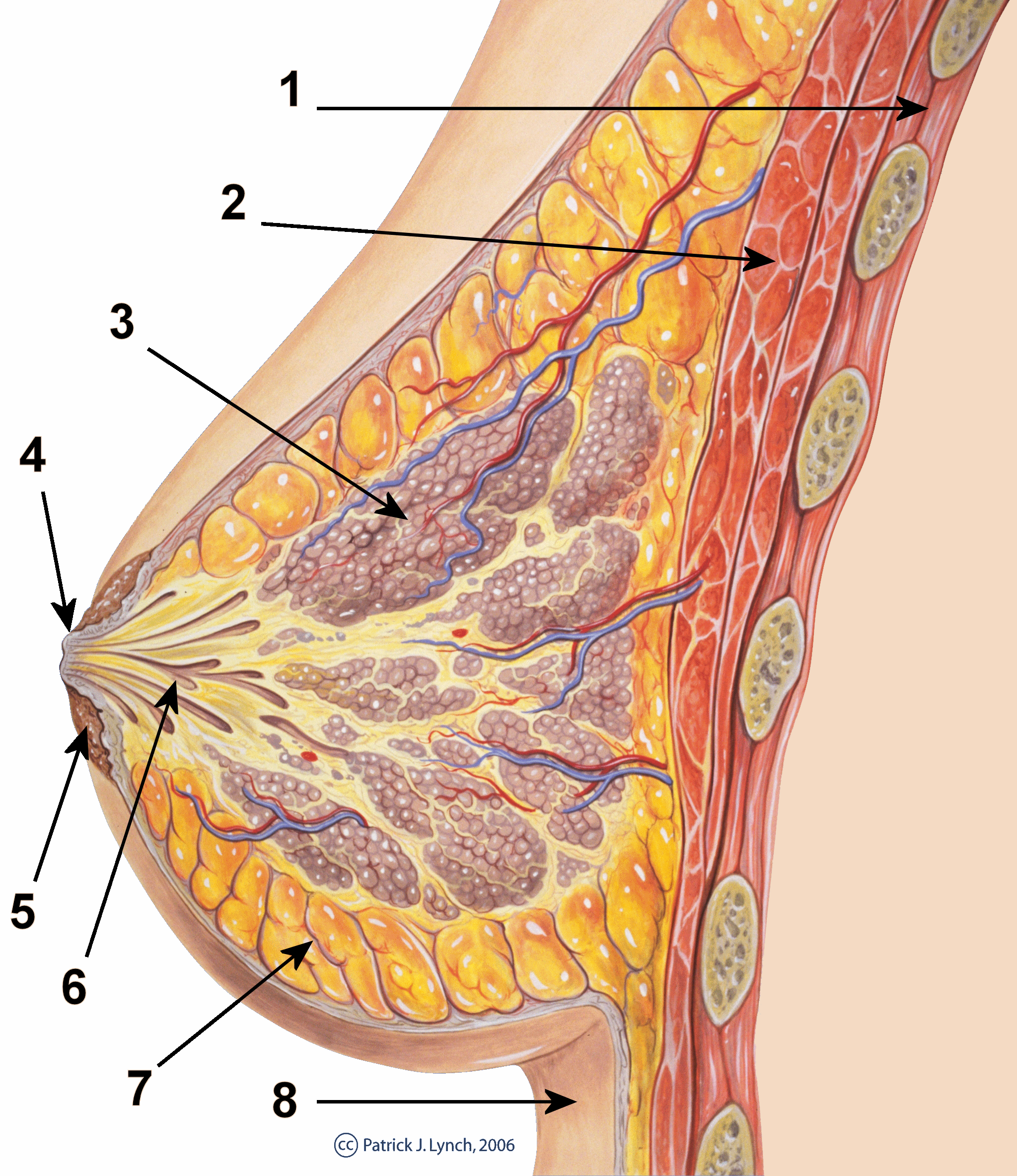
Diagram of the anatomy of the female breast. (1) Chest wall, (2) Pectoral muscles, (3) Lobules, (4) Nipple surface, (5) Areola, (6) Lactiferous duct, (7) Fatty tissue, (8) Skin. Image illustrated by Patrick J. Lynch, and reworked by Morgoth666 to add labels.

Similar to the breast, each NAC is unique. The anatomy of the NAC differs in size, texture, and color between different ethnicities and individuals. Oftentimes, a patient may have two areolas of different morphology. The nipple itself is defined as a protruded structure containing an abundance of sensory nerve endings and smooth muscle bundles facilitating erection for breastfeeding. It is located on the center of a pigmented patch on the breast, known as the areola. Although there is no standard dimension for the NAC, the approximately 4-7mm nipple can protrude for over 1 cm from the typically 4.2-4.5cm diameter areola.

Within the areola, gross anatomy includes the lactiferous ducts that drain the 15-20 mammary gland lobes extending into the depths of the breast. The areolas cellular composition includes an assortment of cells and specific tissues that support the primary function of the mammary glands, secretion and drainage of breast milk during lactation. The NAC is supported by stratified keratinized squamous epithelium that extend towards the surface of the nipple ducts. This pathway facilitates metastasis of carcinomas such as, syringomatous adenomas, throughout the areola, it can allow cancer cells in the subareolar ducts to travel to the nipple skin. On the surface of the areola, there are bumps denoted as Morgagni tubercles, which connect to the Montgomery glands. The montgomery glands are modified sebaceous glands connected to premature mammary glands, this connection facilitates secretion of milk during lactation through areolar lubrication.

To support the structures within the NAC, vascularization mainly depends on the dermal and subdermal plexuses. These networks of blood vessels include the internal and external mammary arteries in the subcutaneous tissue which primarily provide blood to the NAC alongside the thoracoacromial arteries and intercostal perforator arteries. Provision of blood to the base of the nipple is accomplished through branching vessels of the mammary arteries. However, each breast would have different vasculature and can be affected by breast and NAC reconstruction procedures.

== Procedures ==
The purpose of NAC reconstruction, which is often performed a few months after other breast related operations are completed, is to create a 3-dimensional structure from a 2-dimensional template such as breast skin. Over time, more than 60 techniques have been introduced. There are several procedures under the NAC reconstruction category, with mainstream options being flap based construction, augmentation grafting, nipple sharing, and 3d tattoos.

=== Nipple sharing ===
Nipple sharing is one of the pioneers of NAC and was first introduced in 1972. It is mainly applied for nipples that have a contralateral height of over 1 cm. Nipple sharing utilizes the most anterior part of the donor or native nipple or a wedge of the donor nipple is surgically removed to be used as a graft. Within this branch there are two techniques, longitudinal splitting and decapitation. For decapitation, at least 50% of a donor's nipple should be preserved to ensure nipple erection and sensation. To transplant the donor nipple, it is sutured onto the patient when the area of treatment undergoes removal of epithelial cells. As this procedure only forms the most anterior part of the NAC, the areola is typically 3D-tattooed.

=== 3D tattooing ===
3D tattooing is recommended for patients who cannot undergo surgery due to risk of complications. Tattoo-artists imitate the morphological features of the nipple through detail and shading, creating the optical illusion and a 3-dimensional nipple despite the surface being flat.

=== Flap-based construction ===
There are many types of flap based construction, with the most common one being local flaps, which has a few subcategories. These subcategories include centrally based flaps, subdermal pedicled flaps, and purse-string flaps. In terms of shape, there have been star flap, skate flap, S-flap, H-flap, C-V flap, arrow flap, cylindrical flap, and more. A common weakness of local flap based construction techniques is the loss of projection and diameter. The technique mainly involves suturing different skin flaps, known as dermal fat flaps, together to form the shape of the NAC.

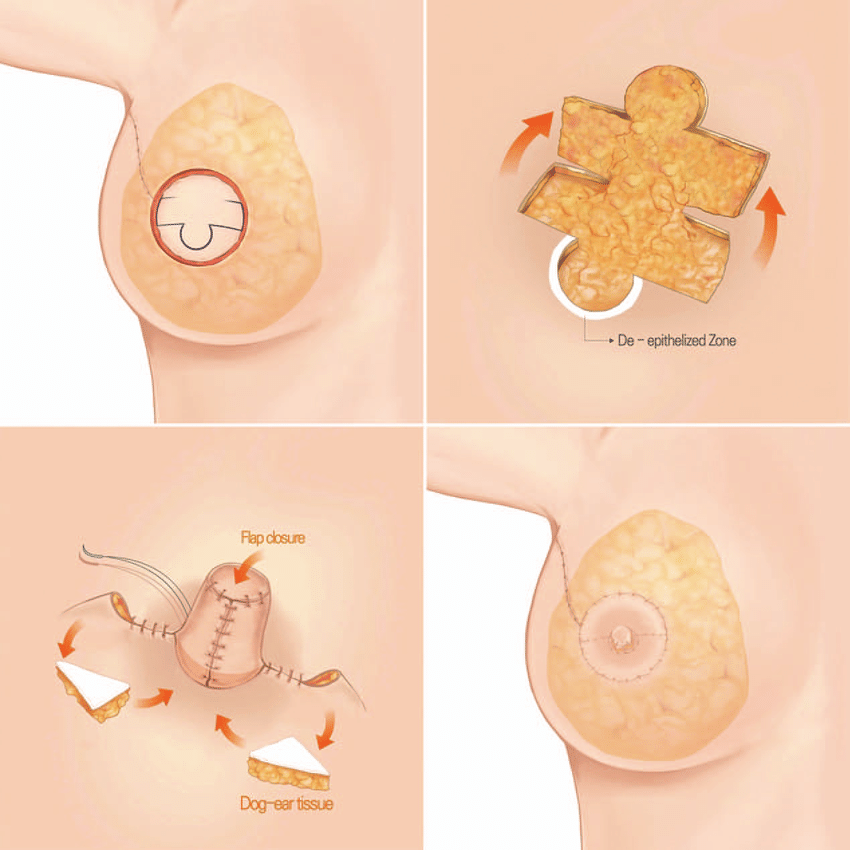
Diagram showing the four main steps in the C-H flap technique for nipple reconstruction

=== Augmented grafting ===
Augmented grafting is often an additional procedure to refine the structure of the reconstructed nipple that experienced flattening as an adverse effect due to the loss of smooth connective tissue support and wound scarring. The procedure aims to increase nipple projection through autologous or heterologous materials. Autologous tissues include structural supporters such as dermis, cartilage from the ribs or rim of the ear, adipose or fat tissue, and mucosa from the oral cavity. Some procedures can facilitate the attainment of costal cartilage such as internal mammary vessel dissection for flap based- breast reconstruction procedures. Heterologous materials can be allogeneic natural materials or synthetic foreign bodies l. Synthetic foreign bodies mainly act as scaffolding to allow the hosts' own cells to recellularize the affected NAC itself. Due to foreign body response, alloplastic materials come with higher risk of complications compared to autologous grafts. Such complications include protruding implants, necrosis, dyschromia, loss of sensation, and wound dehiscence.

== Postoperative care ==
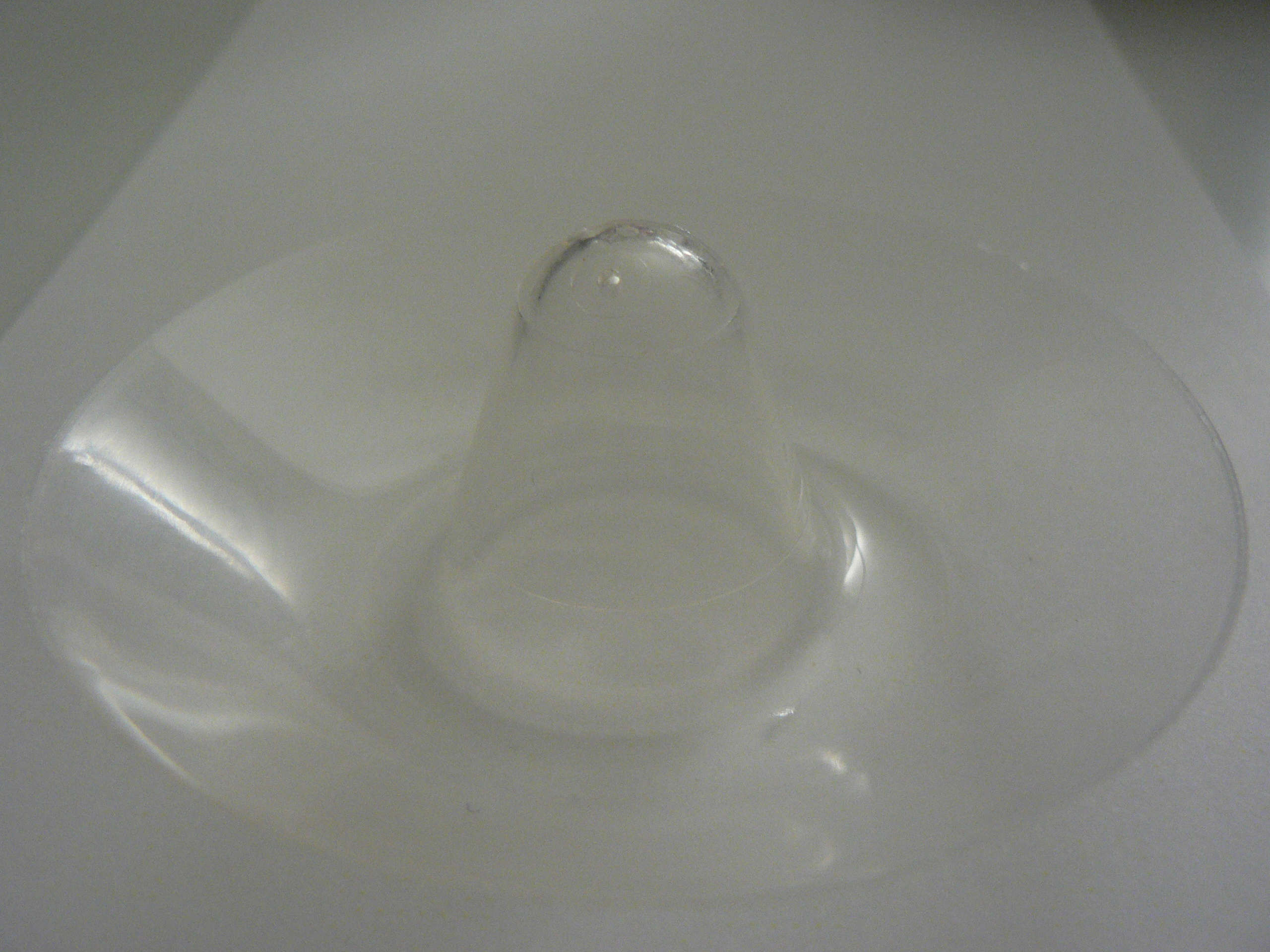
A silicon nipple shield, also known as a nipple guard. Image by Harmid.

Postoperative care is relatively short as dressing is typically maintained for 2 weeks. Some common dressings include covering the area of operation with antibiotic cream, petroleum jelly dressing, stacking gauze, and nipple guards. In addition to protection of the reconstructed nipple, analgesic painkillers are prescribed other than some flap reconstruction cases where sensation has yet to be restored. 2 weeks post-operation, sutures can be removed which may result in a longer a pointier nipple projection for 1 month when the elongated c-flap is used for reconstruction. As recovery is quite quick, patients' regular routines are not disrupted unless complications occur.

== Risks and complications ==
There are risks involved in nipple reconstruction. Upon completion of the procedure, patients are at risk of flap necrosis, local infections, separation of tissue due to improper wound healing, and accumulation of fluid in an orifice of the breast (seroma). Flap necrosis is a common adverse effect that accompanies mastectomies but systematic reviews have shown that this can be reduced through application of nitroglycerin ointment.

A direct side effect of nipple reconstruction is the long-term loss of nipple projection; this is a sign that the procedure has failed if over 80% of pre-procedure projection has been lost over time. The loss of projection is often a mental burden for patients that receive NAC reconstruction. Currently, there are no techniques that prevent the loss of projection over time. The loss of projection has similar mechanisms to the inverted nipple, in which fibrous muscle bands at the base of the nipple are unable to retract normally. The erection of a nipple is dependent on the sympathetic nervous system and the smooth muscles within the nipple, thus if the nipple receives damage there would be loss of projection. Specifically, procedures can cause the loss of projection due to scar contracture, surrounding skin causing retraction, and the lack of blood perfusion within the area. Although there are no existing procedures that prevent loss of nipple projection, augmentation grafting or repetition of local flaps can be done to recover some projection. However, some procedures such as longitudinal splitting and decapitation only reduce projection by 50%.
