= NKAPD1 =

Human NKAPD1 Protein

Identifiers
- Aliases: NKAPD1, C11orf57, chromosome 11 open reading frame 57, NKAP domain containing 1
- External IDs: MGI: 2143205; HomoloGene: 41233; GeneCards: NKAPD1; OMA:NKAPD1 - orthologs

Gene location (Human)
Chr.	Chromosome 11 (human)
Band	11q23.1	Start	112,074,086 bp
Band	11q23.1	End	112,085,150 bp

Gene location (Mouse)
Chr.	Chromosome 9 (mouse)
Band	9|9 A5.3	Start	50,516,540 bp
Band	9|9 A5.3	End	50,528,764 bp
RNA expression pattern
Bgee	Human / Mouse (ortholog); Top expressed in: Achilles tendon; buccal mucosa cell; sural nerve; ganglionic eminence; monocyte; endothelial cell; secondary oocyte; epithelium of colon; cerebellar hemisphere; testicle / Top expressed in: genital tubercle; tail of embryo; zygote; secondary oocyte; embryo; ventricular zone; cumulus cell; epiblast; embryo; muscle of thigh; More reference expression data
BioGPS	n/a
Orthologs
Species	Human	Mouse
Entrez	55216	270156
Ensembl	ENSG00000150776	ENSMUSG00000059820
UniProt	Q6ZUT1	n/a
RefSeq (mRNA)	NM_001082969; NM_001082970; NM_001301017; NM_001301019; NM_001301021 NM_018195	NM_001134902; NM_212449; NM_001360340
RefSeq (protein)	NP_001076438; NP_001076439; NP_001287946; NP_001287948; NP_001287950 NP_060665	n/a
Location (UCSC)	Chr 11: 112.07 – 112.09 Mb	Chr 9: 50.52 – 50.53 Mb
PubMed search
- Wikidata
View/Edit Human	View/Edit Mouse

NKAPD1 (NF-kappa-B-activating protein domain containing 1) is a protein, which in humans, is encoded by the gene NKAPD1. This protein is also commonly referred to as C11ORF57 (Chromosome 11 Open Reading Frame 57).

== Gene ==
The NKAPD1 gene is found on human chromosome 11 at locus 11q23.1 with plus strand orientation. The exact location is 112,074,086 to 112,085,150, spanning a total of 11,065 base pairs, including introns.

It can be transcribed into 7 different transcript variants resulting in 4 different isoforms of the protein. The longest mRNA transcript contains a total of 6 exons.

=== Gene neighborhood ===
The human NKAPD1 gene is closely surrounded by the following genes on chromosome 11.

- DLAT
- PIH1D2
- TIMM8B
- SDHD

=== Gene expression ===
The human NKAPD1 gene is ubiquitously expressed at moderate levels in various normal tissues throughout the body, with higher expression in the brain and thyroid.

== Protein ==
=== Transcripts ===
The longest protein isoform produced by the human NKAPD1 gene is known as isoform a and it is 293 amino acids long. This particular protein isoform has a predicted molecular weight around 34 kDa.

Transcript Variants and Protein Isoforms of NKAPD1
Transcript Variant	Isoform	mRNA Accession #	mRNA Length	Protein Accession #	Protein Length	Notes
1	isoform a	NM_018195.4	3686 nt	NP_060665.3	293 aa	Longest isoform and mRNA
2	isoform a	NM_001082969.2	3128 nt	NP_001076438.1	293 aa	Different in 5’ UTR
3	isoform b	NM_001082970.2	3683 nt	NP_001076439.1	292 aa	Alternate splice site in 3’ coding region
4	N/A	NR_103469.2	3727 nt	N/A	N/A	Non-coding RNA
5	isoform b	NM_001301017.2	3125 nt	NP_001287946.1	292 aa	Alternate splice site at 5’ end of last exon
6	isoform c	NM_001301019.2	3169 nt	NP_001287948.1	264 aa	Alternate exons 1 and 2, uses alternate start codon
7	isoform d	NM_001301021.2	3166 nt	NP_001287950.1	263 aa	Alternate exons 1 and 2

=== Domains ===
The human NKAPD1 protein contains one domain called the NKAP (NF-kappa-B-activating protein) domain. It also has a lysine rich region directly following the NKAP domain.

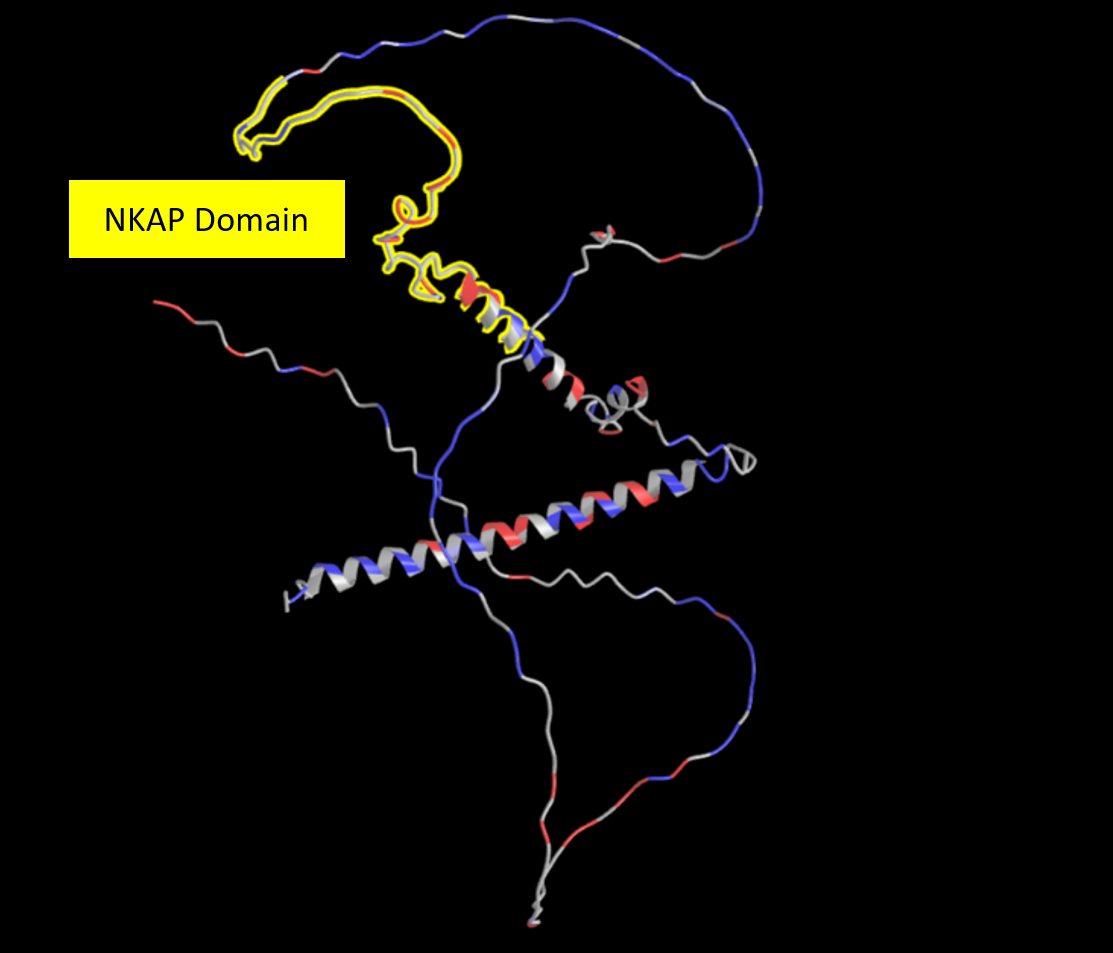
Predicted three-dimensional structure of human NKAPD1 protein from AlphaFold, annotated with iCn3D.

=== Structure ===
Secondary structure predictions suggest that the NKAPD1 protein consists mainly of alpha helices. Predicted three-dimensional structures showed mostly coils with a few small regions of alpha helices.

=== Post-translational modifications ===
The human NKAPD1 protein is predicted to undergo SUMOylation at several different lysines as well as phosphorylation, acetylation, and N-myristoylation at different amino acids.

== Homology and evolution ==
=== Orthologs ===
Orthologs to the human NKAPD1 gene can be found in all vertebrates through sharks, rays, and lampreys, however it is not found in any invertebrates. This gene is shown to be very highly conserved in mammals.

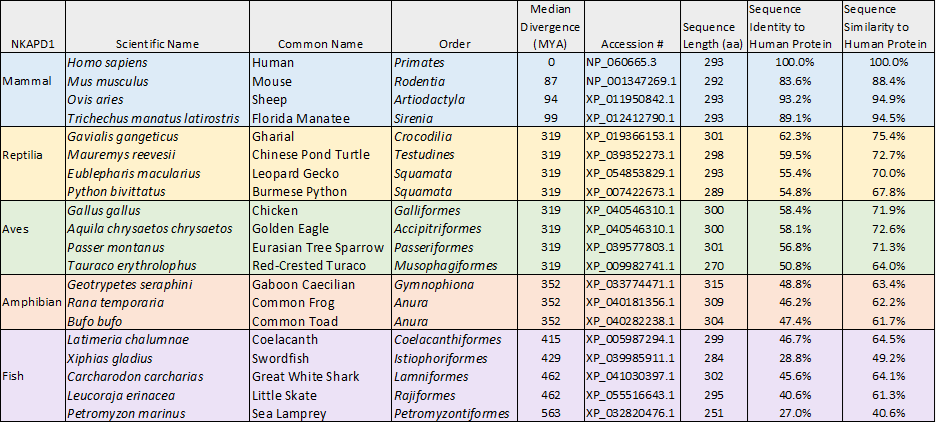
Table of strict and distant orthologs to the human NKAPD1 protein. Organized by median date of divergence and percent sequence identity to the human protein.

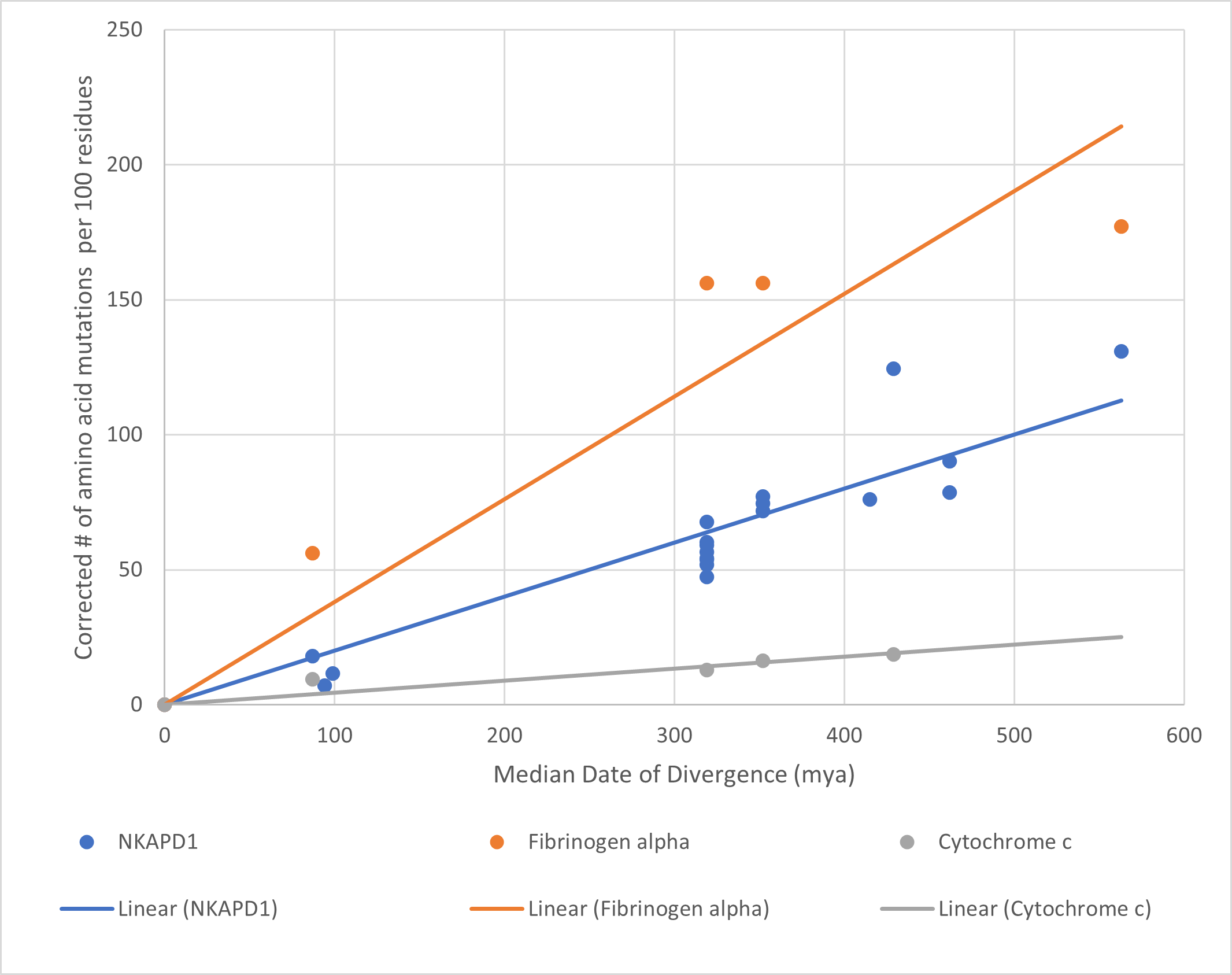
Graph showing the mutation rate per 100 residues of NKAPD1 gene in comparison to fibrinogen alpha and cytochrome c.

=== Evolution ===
When compared to fibrinogen alpha and cytochrome c, the human NKAPD1 gene seems to be evolving at a fairly moderate rate.

== Interacting proteins ==
There were 8 proteins found to have potential interactions with the human NKAPD1 protein. The table below shows the possible relationships between these proteins and the human NKAPD1 protein.

Table of NKAPD1 Interacting Proteins (Organized by Score)
Name	Full Name	Basis	Score	Function	Tissue Expression	Subcellular Localization
CSNK2A1	casein kinase 2 alpha 1	Experimental/Biochemical Data	0.615	Regulates numerous cellular processes	Ubiquitous	nucleus
PNN	pinin	Co-Expression, Experimental/Biochemical Data	0.570	Component of multiprotein exon junction complex	Ubiquitous	nucleus
DHX8	DEAH-box helicase 8	Experimental/Biochemical Data	0.563	facilitates nuclear export of spliced mRNA	Ubiquitous	nucleus
C9orf78	Chromosome 9 open reading frame 78	Co-Expression, Experimental/Biochemical Data	0.541	regulation of telomere assembly and telomere length	Ubiquitous	nucleus
RP9	RP9 pre-mRNA splicing factor	Co-Expression, Experimental/Biochemical Data	0.527	Target protein for PM1 kinase, B-cell proliferation	Ubiquitous	nucleus, vesicles, and cytosol
CSNK2A2	casein kinase 2 alpha 2	Co-Expression, Experimental/Biochemical Data	0.505	Regulates numerous cellular processes	testes	nucleus
SREK1IP1	SREK1 interacting protein 1	Co-Expression, Experimental/Biochemical Data	0.502	Possible splicing regulator related to cell survival	Ubiquitous	nucleus
SYF2	SYF2 pre-mRNA splicing factor	Co-Expression, Experimental/Biochemical Data	0.482	component of spliceosome, pre-mRNA splicing	Ubiquitous	nucleus

== Clinical significance ==
Preliminary findings in three published studies suggest that deletion of the NKAPD1 gene, both complete and partial, are associated with the development of paraganglioma, a rare tumor of the head and neck. This research suggest that these deletions often occur hand-in-hand with deletions of several other nearby genes as well, most prominently SDHD, DLAT, PIHD2, and TIMM8B.
