= Zellballen =

Mass of cells indicative of pheochromocytoma

A zellballen is a small nest of chromaffin cells or chief cells with pale eosinophilic staining. Zellballen are separated into groups by segmenting bands of fibrovascular stroma, and are surrounded by supporting sustentacular cells. A zellballen pattern is diagnostic for paraganglioma or pheochromocytoma.

Zellballen is German for "ball of cells".
