= Corpora paraaortica =

Corpora paraaortica can refer to:

- Aortic body (glomus aorticum)
- Organ of Zuckerkandl
