= TMEM127 =

Transmembrane protein

Identifiers
- Aliases: TMEM127, transmembrane protein 127
- External IDs: OMIM: 613403; MGI: 1916720; HomoloGene: 9877; GeneCards: TMEM127; OMA:TMEM127 - orthologs

Gene location (Human)
Chr.	Chromosome 2 (human)
Band	2q11.2	Start	96,248,514 bp
Band	2q11.2	End	96,265,997 bp

Gene location (Mouse)
Chr.	Chromosome 2 (mouse)
Band	2 F1|2 61.87 cM	Start	127,089,828 bp
Band	2 F1|2 61.87 cM	End	127,103,027 bp
RNA expression pattern
Bgee	Human / Mouse (ortholog); Top expressed in: white blood cell; monocyte; blood; left ventricle; stromal cell of endometrium; buccal mucosa cell; apex of heart; endothelial cell; granulocyte; gallbladder / Top expressed in: otolith organ; utricle; ascending aorta; aortic valve; supraoptic nucleus; conjunctival fornix; granulocyte; facial motor nucleus; stroma of bone marrow; ciliary body; More reference expression data
BioGPS	n/a
Gene ontology
Molecular function	molecular function
Cellular component	cytoplasm; integral component of membrane; plasma membrane; early endosome; membrane
Biological process	regulation of TOR signaling; endosome organization; negative regulation of cell population proliferation; negative regulation of TOR signaling
Sources:Amigo / QuickGO
Orthologs
Species	Human	Mouse
Entrez	55654	69470
Ensembl	ENSG00000135956	ENSMUSG00000034850
UniProt	O75204	Q8BGP5
RefSeq (mRNA)	NM_032218; NM_001193304; NM_017849	NM_175145; NM_001362704
RefSeq (protein)	NP_001180233; NP_060319	NP_780354; NP_001349633
Location (UCSC)	Chr 2: 96.25 – 96.27 Mb	Chr 2: 127.09 – 127.1 Mb
PubMed search
- Wikidata
View/Edit Human	View/Edit Mouse

Transmembrane protein 127 (TMEM127) is a transmembrane protein which is encoded by the TMEM127 gene. It has been demonstrated to be a negative regulator MTOR signalling. TMEM127 is a tumor suppressor gene, inactivating germline mutations in which causes hereditary pheochromocytoma and paraganglioma.
