= List of MeSH codes (A05) =

The following is a partial list of the "A" codes for Medical Subject Headings (MeSH), as defined by the United States National Library of Medicine (NLM).

This list continues the information at List of MeSH codes (A04). Codes following these are found at List of MeSH codes (A06). For other MeSH codes, see List of MeSH codes.

Authoritative sources for this content are the MeSH Browser and MeSH SPARQL Explorer.

== MeSH A05 – urogenital system ==
=== MeSH A05.360 – genitalia ===
==== MeSH A05.360.319 – genitalia, female ====
- MeSH A05.360.319.114 – adnexa uteri
- MeSH A05.360.319.114.170 – broad ligament
- MeSH A05.360.319.114.373 – fallopian tubes
- MeSH A05.360.319.114.630 – ovary
- MeSH A05.360.319.114.630.278 – corpus luteum
- MeSH A05.360.319.114.630.278.400 – luteal cells
- MeSH A05.360.319.114.630.535 – ovarian follicle
- MeSH A05.360.319.114.630.535.150 – follicular fluid
- MeSH A05.360.319.114.630.535.200 – granulosa cells
- MeSH A05.360.319.114.630.535.200.500 - Cumulus Cells
- MeSH A05.360.319.114.630.535.400 – theca cells
- MeSH A05.360.319.114.815 – round ligament of uterus
- MeSH A05.360.319.679 – uterus
- MeSH A05.360.319.679.256 – cervix uteri
- MeSH A05.360.319.679.490 – endometrium
- MeSH A05.360.319.679.490.373 – decidua
- MeSH A05.360.319.679.490.373.500 – deciduoma
- MeSH A05.360.319.679.690 – myometrium
- MeSH A05.360.319.779 – vagina
- MeSH A05.360.319.779.479 – hymen
- MeSH A05.360.319.887 – vulva
- MeSH A05.360.319.887.220 – Bartholin's glands
- MeSH A05.360.319.887.436 – clitoris

==== MeSH A05.360.444 – genitalia, male ====
- MeSH A05.360.444.123 – bulbourethral glands
- MeSH A05.360.444.251 – ejaculatory ducts
- MeSH A05.360.444.371 – epididymis
- MeSH A05.360.444.492 – penis
- Mesh A05.360.444.492.362 - foreskin
- MeSH A05.360.444.492.726 – urethra
- MeSH A05.360.444.575 – prostate
- MeSH A05.360.444.661 – scrotum
- MeSH A05.360.444.713 – seminal vesicles
- MeSH A05.360.444.777 – spermatic cord
- MeSH A05.360.444.849 – testis
- MeSH A05.360.444.849.513 – leydig cells
- MeSH A05.360.444.849.600 – rete testis
- MeSH A05.360.444.849.700 – seminiferous tubules
- MeSH A05.360.444.849.700.349 – blood-testis barrier
- MeSH A05.360.444.849.700.700 – seminiferous epithelium
- MeSH A05.360.444.849.789 – sertoli cells
- MeSH A05.360.444.930 – vas deferens

==== MeSH A05.360.490 – germ cells ====
- MeSH A05.360.490.690 – ovum
- MeSH A05.360.490.690.680 – oocytes
- MeSH A05.360.490.690.680.500 - polar bodies
- MeSH A05.360.490.690.700 – oogonia
- MeSH A05.360.490.690.950 – zona pellucida
- MeSH A05.360.490.690.970 – zygote
- MeSH A05.360.490.890 – spermatozoa
- MeSH A05.360.490.890.820 – sperm head
- MeSH A05.360.490.890.820.100 – acrosome
- MeSH A05.360.490.890.830 – sperm midpiece
- MeSH A05.360.490.890.840 – sperm tail
- MeSH A05.360.490.890.860 – spermatids
- MeSH A05.360.490.890.880 – spermatocytes
- MeSH A05.360.490.890.900 – spermatogonia

=== MeSH A05.810 – urinary tract ===
==== MeSH A05.810.453 – kidney ====
- MeSH A05.810.453.324 – kidney cortex
- MeSH A05.810.453.324.359 – kidney glomerulus
- MeSH A05.810.453.324.359.372 - glomerular filtration barrier
- MeSH A05.810.453.324.359.372.400– glomerular basement membrane
- Mesh A05.810.453.324.359.372.650 - podocytes
- MeSH A05.810.453.324.359.520 – juxtaglomerular apparatus
- MeSH A05.810.453.324.359.620 - mesangial cells
- MeSH A05.810.453.324.359.620.500 - glomerular mesangium
- MeSH A05.810.453.466 – kidney medulla
- MeSH A05.810.453.537 – kidney pelvis
- MeSH A05.810.453.537.503 – kidney calices
- MeSH A05.810.453.736 – nephrons
- MeSH A05.810.453.736.520 – kidney glomerulus
- MeSH A05.810.453.736.520.372 - glomerular filtration barrier
- MeSH A05.810.453.736.520.224 - podocytes
- MeSH A05.810.453.736.520.520 – juxtaglomerular apparatus
- MeSH A05.810.453.736.520.620 - mensangial cells
- MeSH A05.810.453.736.520.620.500 - glomerular mensangium
- MeSH A05.810.453.736.560 – kidney tubules
- MeSH A05.810.453.736.560.254 – bowman capsule
- MeSH A05.810.453.736.560.510 – kidney tubules, collecting
- MeSH A05.810.453.736.560.540 – kidney tubules, distal
- MeSH A05.810.453.736.560.570 – kidney tubules, proximal
- MeSH A05.810.453.736.560.610 – loop of henle

==== MeSH A05.810.890 - urinary bladder ====
The list continues at List of MeSH codes (A06).
