= Paraganglion =

Group of non-neuronal cells

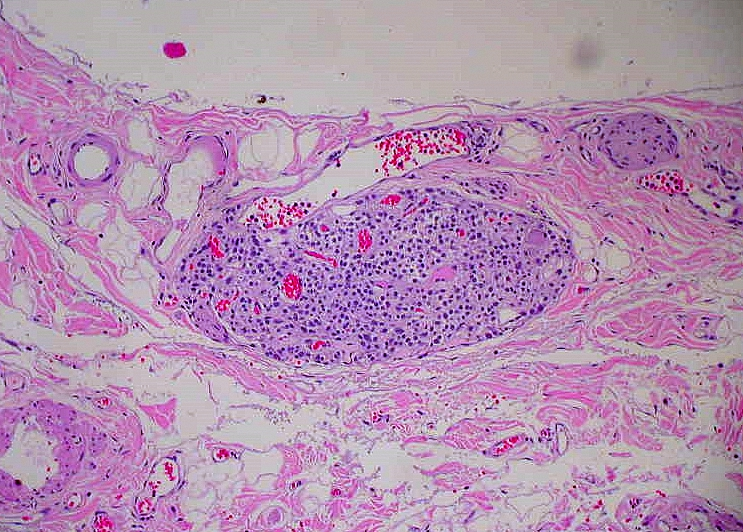
- Paraganglion of gallbladder

Identifiers
- TH: H3.08.02.8.00001
- FMA: 15648

A paraganglion (pl. paraganglia) is a group of non-neuronal cells derived of the neural crest. They are named for being generally in close proximity to sympathetic ganglia. They are essentially of two types: (1) chromaffin or sympathetic paraganglia made of chromaffin cells and (2) nonchromaffin or parasympathetic paraganglia made of glomus cells. They are neuroendocrine cells, the former with primary endocrine functions and the latter with primary chemoreceptor functions.

Chromaffin paraganglia (also called chromaffin bodies) are connected with the ganglia of the sympathetic trunk and the ganglia of the celiac, renal, adrenal, aortic and hypogastric plexuses. They are concentrated near the adrenal glands and essentially function the same way as the adrenal medulla. They are sometimes found in connection with the ganglia of other sympathetic plexuses. None have been found with the sympathetic ganglia associated with the branches of the trigeminal nerve. The largest chromaffin paraganglion is the organ of Zuckerkandl, it is probably the largest source of circulating catecholamines in the fetus and young infants, and gradually atrophies to microscopic loci.

Nonchromaffin paraganglia include carotid bodies and aortic bodies, some are distributed in the ear, along the vagus nerve, in the larynx and at various other places.

== Clinical significance ==
Tumors of the paraganglionic tissues are known as paragangliomas, though this term tends to imply the nonchromaffin type, and can occur at a number of sites throughout the body.

Chromaffin paragangliomas are issued from chromaffin cells, and are known as pheochromocytomas. Adrenal pheochromocytomas are usually benign while extra-adrenal ones are more malignant. They are most of the time in the adrenals, and only rarely outside of the abdomen. They usually secrete hormones and estimates of a familial history vary.

Nonchromaffin paragangliomas are usually benign. They are generally present at the head and neck, most often at carotid body or jugulo-tympanic, they rarely secrete hormones and commonly have a familial history.
