= Gangliocytic paraganglioma =

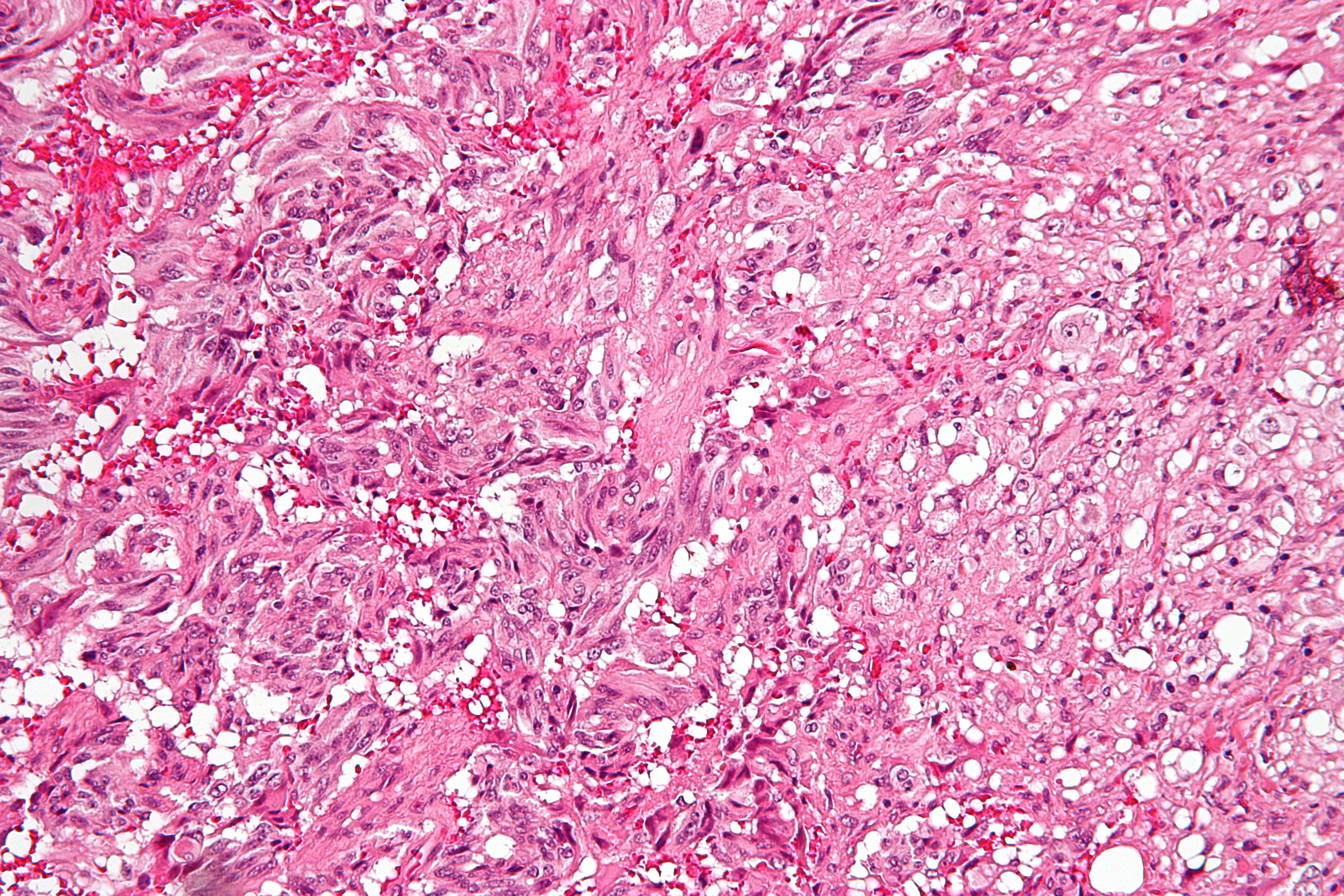
- Micrograph of a gangliocytic paraganglioma. H&E stain.
- Pronunciation: GP
- Specialty: Pathology

A gangliocytic paraganglioma is a rare tumour that is typically found in the duodenum and consists of three components: (1) ganglion cells, (2) epithelioid cells (paraganglioma-like) and, (3) spindle cells (schwannoma-like).

== Symptoms and signs ==
The most common presentation is gastrointestinal bleed (~45% of cases), followed by abdominal pain (~43% of cases) and anemia (~15% of cases).

== Pathology ==
GP consist of three components (1) ganglion cells, (2) epithelioid cells (neuroendocrine-like), and (3) spindle cells (schwannoma-like). The microscopic differential diagnosis includes poorly differentiated carcinoma, neuroendocrine tumour and paraganglioma.

GPs may be sporadic or arise in the context neurofibromatosis type 1.

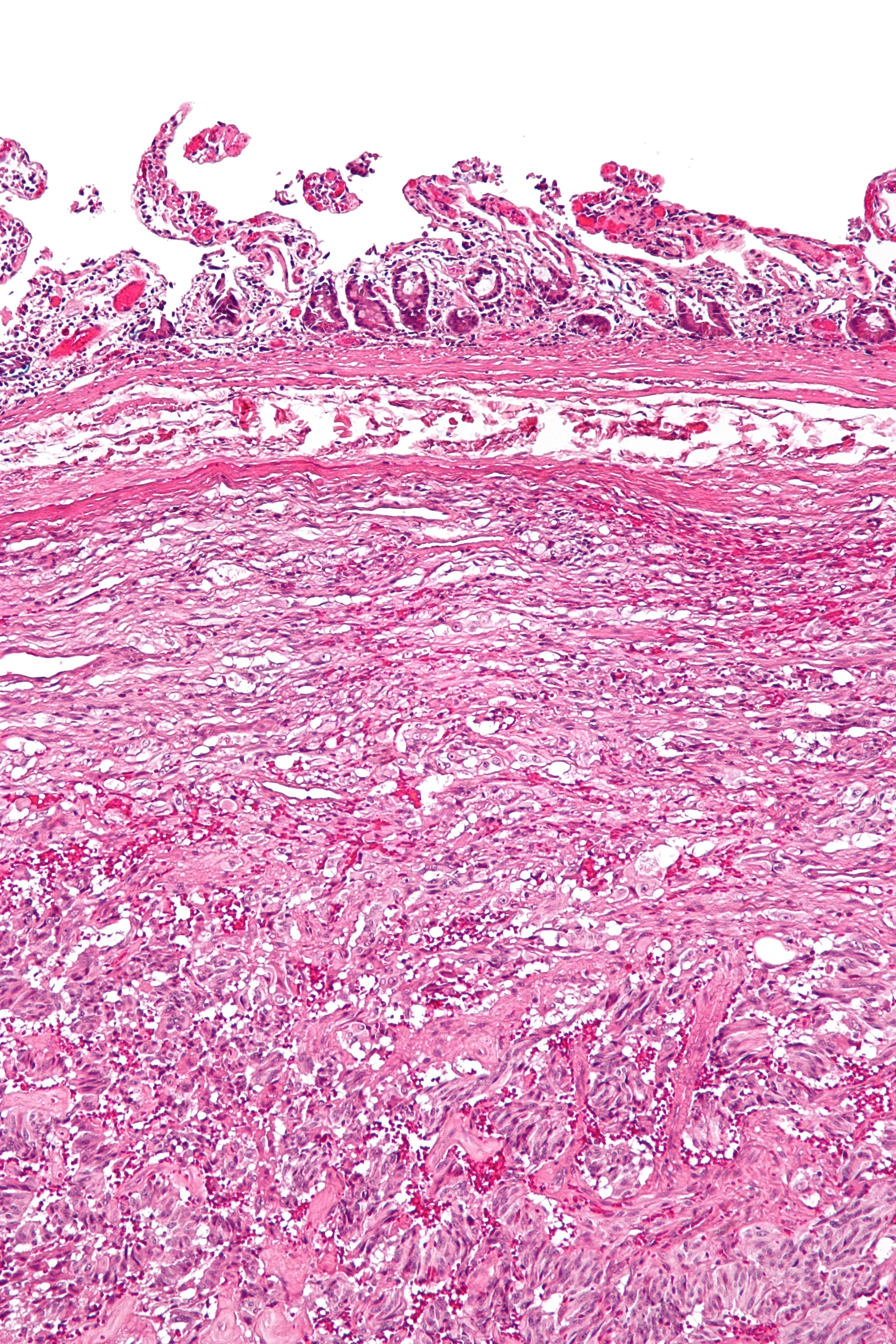
Intermed. mag.

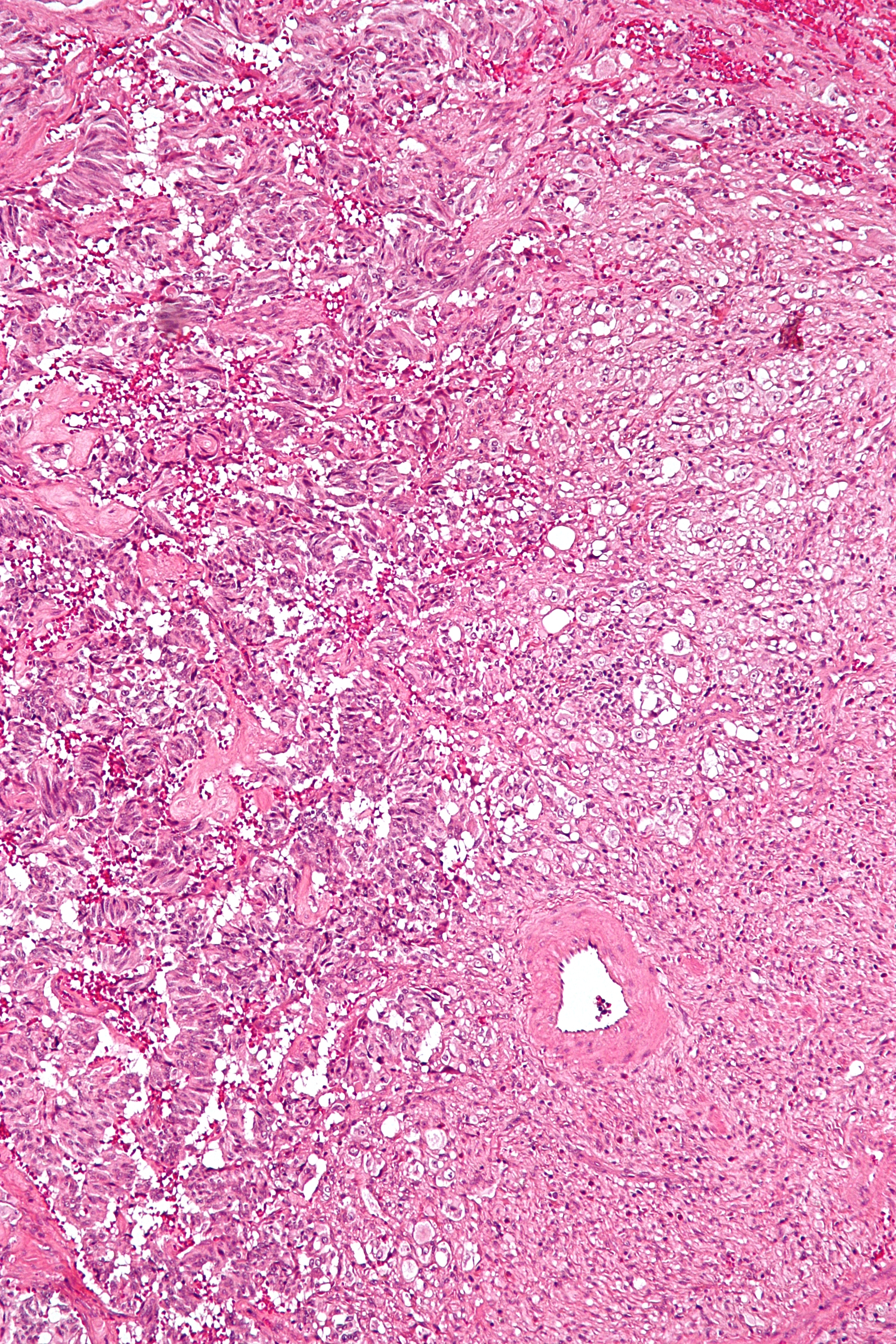
Intermed. mag.

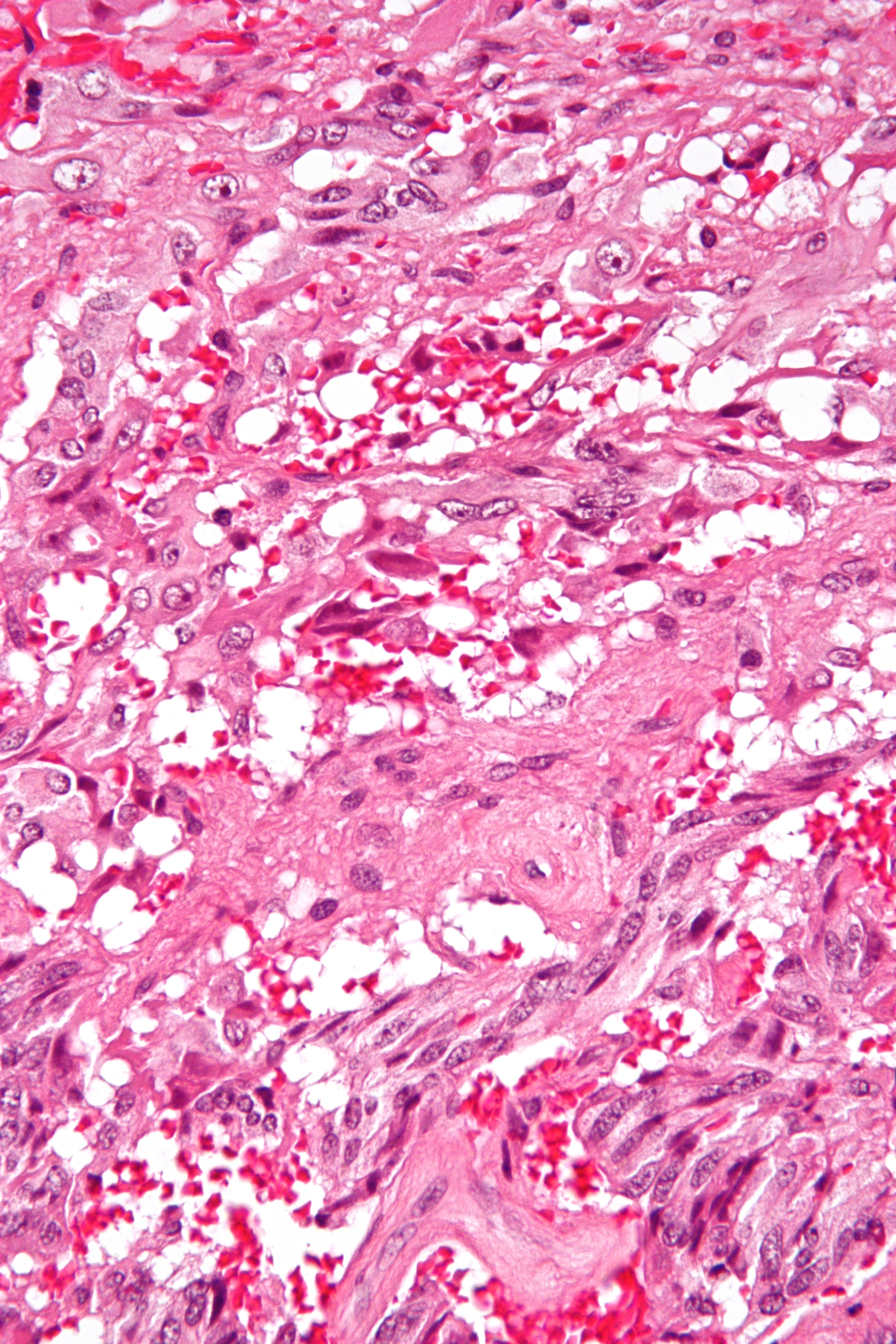
Very high mag.

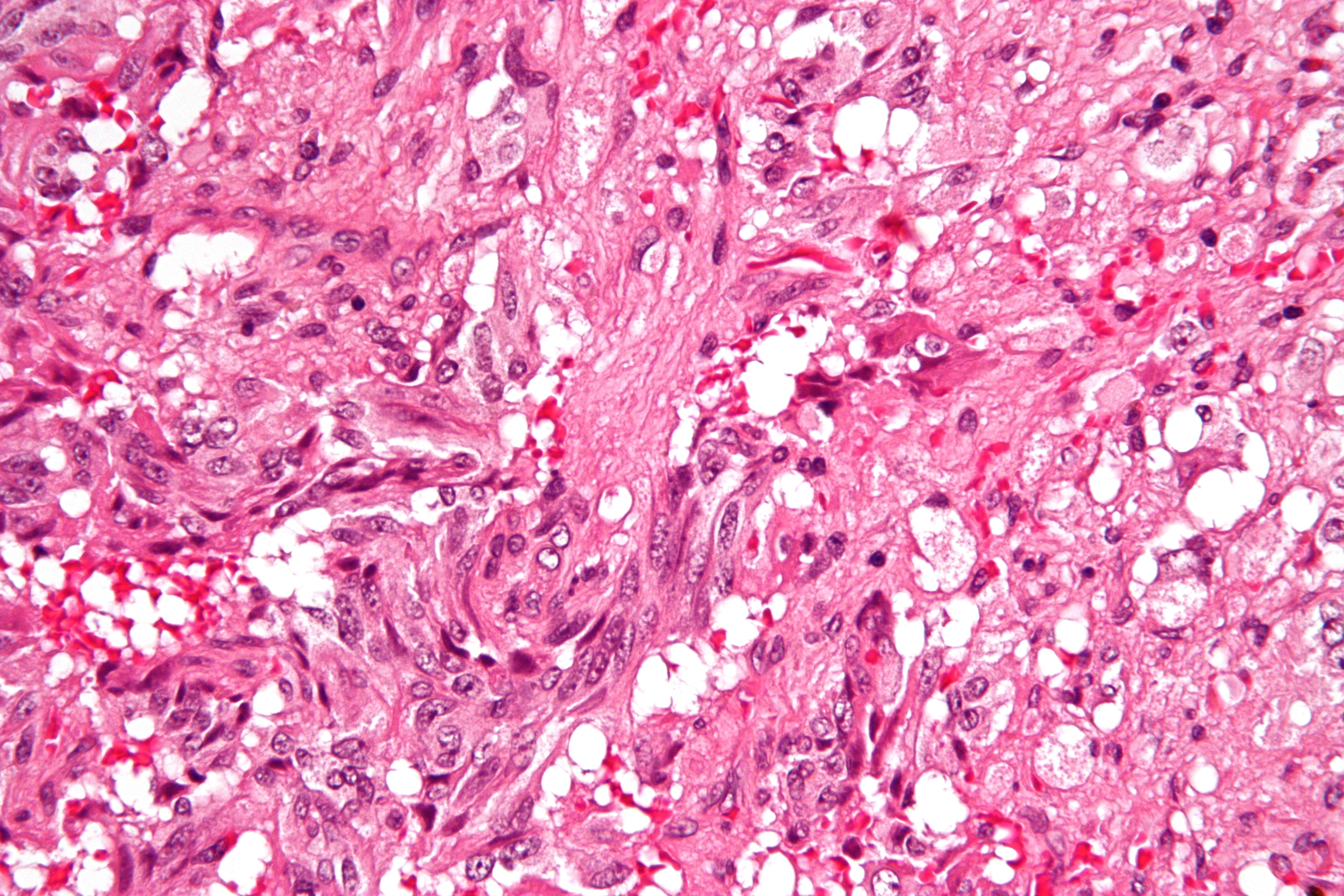
Very high mag.

== See also ==
- Schwannoma
- Paraganglioma
