= Thoracic arteries =

Thoracic arteries can refer to:

- Internal thoracic artery
- Lateral thoracic artery
- Superior thoracic artery
- Thoracic aorta (less common)
