= Mesenteric vein =

Mesenteric vein may refer to:

- Superior mesenteric vein
- Inferior mesenteric vein
