= Tibial arteries =

Tibial arteries may refer to:

- Anterior tibial artery
- Posterior tibial artery
