= Organ of Zuckerkandl =

Organ located at the aortic bifurcation

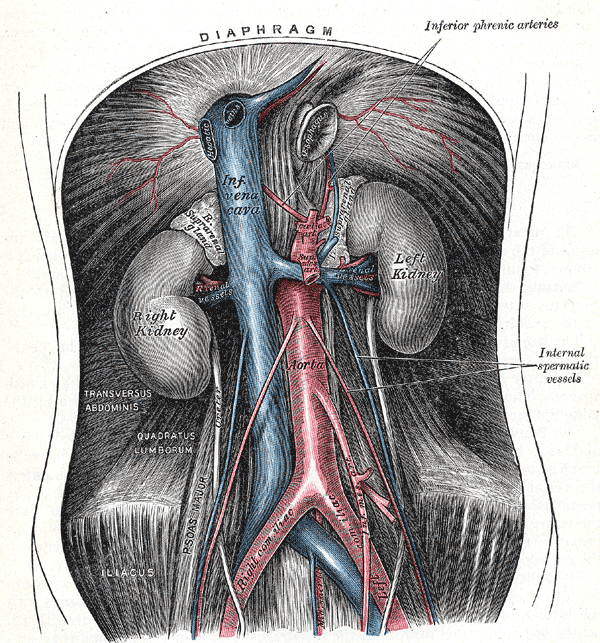
- The abdominal aorta and its branches. (Organ of Zuckerkandl is not shown, but it usually appears alongside the abdominal aorta.)

Identifiers
- MeSH: D010220
- TA98: A12.2.04.003
- TA2: 3889
- FMA: 15647

The organ of Zuckerkandl consist of chromaffin cells that are responsible for synthesizing, storing and secreting catecholamines. The organ typically degenerates within the first 2-3 years of life. Located at the bifurcation of the aorta or at the origin of the inferior mesenteric artery. It can be the source of a paraganglioma.

The term paraaortic body is also sometimes used to describe it, as it usually arises near the abdominal aorta, but this term can be the source of confusion, because the term "corpora paraaortica" is also used to describe the aortic body, which arises near the thoracic aorta. This diffused group of neuroendocrine sympathetic fibres was first described by Emil Zuckerkandl, a professor of anatomy at the University of Vienna, in 1901.

Some sources equate the "aortic bodies" and "paraaortic bodies", while other sources explicitly distinguish between the two. When a distinction is made, the "aortic bodies" are chemoreceptors which regulate circulation, while the "paraaortic bodies" are the chromaffin cells which manufacture catecholamines.

Organs of Zuckerkandl (O of Z) harbor the potential for deadly paragangliomas. Paragangliomas are one of the surgical causes of hypertension. Major treatises of medicine offer very little information on this topic.

== Cases ==
In rare cases the organ is preserved into adulthood. One such example was a 63-yer-old female reported to have extra-adrenal pheochromocytoma from organ of Zuckerkandl which was confirmed with CT and MRI.

== Function ==
Its physiological role is thought to be of the greatest importance during the early gestational period as a homeostatic regulator of blood pressure, secreting catecholamines into the fetal circulation.

The organ itself regresses in the late third trimester and following birth to form the aorticosympathetic group of the adult paraganglia.

== Clinical significance ==
=== Pathology ===
It can be the source of paraganglioma.

The organ of Zuckerkandl is of pathological significance in the adult as a common extra-adrenal site of pheochromocytoma though the most common extra-adrenal site is in the superior para-aortic region between the diaphragm and lower renal poles.

Extra-adrenal tumors account for around 25% of all cases of pheochromocytoma. Resection has been described.

In addition to its endocrine effects, it can also cause obstructive pathology.
