= Chromaffin cell =

Neuroendocrine cells found in adrenal medulla in mammals

Medullary chromaffin cell
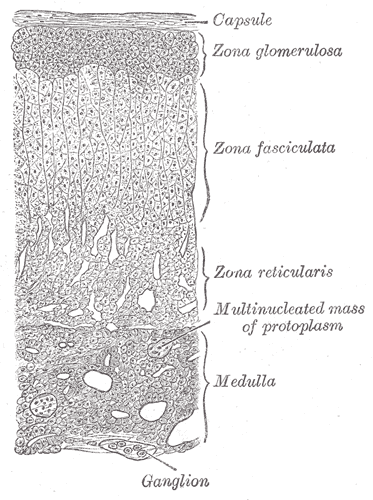
- Adrenal gland. (Medulla labeled at bottom right.)

Details
- Location: Medulla adrenal gland

Identifiers
- Latin: endocrinocytus medullaris
- MeSH: D019439
- TH: H3.08.02.6.00015
- FMA: 69263

Chromaffin cells, also called pheochromocytes (or phaeochromocytes), are neuroendocrine cells found mostly in the medulla of the adrenal glands in mammals. These cells serve a variety of functions such as serving as a response to stress, monitoring carbon dioxide and oxygen concentrations in the body, maintenance of respiration and the regulation of blood pressure. They are in close proximity to pre-synaptic sympathetic ganglia of the sympathetic nervous system, with which they communicate, and structurally they are similar to post-synaptic sympathetic neurons. In order to activate chromaffin cells, the splanchnic nerve of the sympathetic nervous system releases acetylcholine, which then binds to nicotinic acetylcholine receptors on the adrenal medulla. This causes the release of catecholamines. The chromaffin cells release catecholamines: ~80% of adrenaline (epinephrine) and ~20% of noradrenaline (norepinephrine) into systemic circulation for systemic effects on multiple organs (similarly to secretory neurones of the hypothalamus), and can also send paracrine signals. Hence they are called neuroendocrine cells.

== Embryonic origin and structure ==
There are two types of cells that originate from the neural crest and are related to the sympathetic nervous system (originate from a cell called sympathogonia):

1. Neuroblasts: These cells migrate, during the fourth to the fifth week of fetal development in humans, on both sides of the spinal cord toward the region just behind the dorsal aorta forming the two chains of sympathetic ganglia (Sympathetic chain). From these ganglia, the post synaptic sympathetic fibers will arise and extend toward their target organ. Some of these cells will migrate to the adrenal medulla to form sympathetic ganglia cells within the adrenal medulla (without postsynaptic sympathetic fibers). A tumor arising from these cells is called neuroblastoma.
2. Chromaffin cells (or pheochromocytes): These cells will migrate to the area adjacent to the sympathetic ganglia (hence the name paraganglia) and to the adrenal medulla where they will be the most abundant type of cells. The largest extra-adrenal cluster of chromaffin cells in mammals is the organ of Zuckerkandl. Tumors arising from these cell are called paragangliomas or pheochromocytomas. These terms can be used interchangeably but usually paraganglioma refer to a tumor originating from chromaffin cells outside the adrenal gland, which can also be called extra-adrenal pheochromocytoma, whereas pheochromocytoma typically refer to a tumor originating from the chromaffin cells within the adrenal gland.

Chromaffin cells also settle near the vagus nerve and carotid arteries. In lower concentrations, extra-adrenal chromaffin cells also reside in the bladder wall, prostate, and behind the liver.

In non-mammals, chromaffin cells are found in a variety of places, generally not organised as an individual organ, and may be without innervation, relying only on endocrine or paracrine signals for secretion.

== Function ==
Adrenaline (epinephrine)

Noradrenaline (norepinephrine)

Chromaffin cells of the adrenal medulla are innervated by the splanchnic nerve and secrete adrenaline (epinephrine), noradrenaline (norepinephrine), some dopamine, enkephalin and enkephalin-containing peptides, and a few other hormones into the blood stream. The secreted adrenaline and noradrenaline play an important role in the sympathetic nervous system response, commonly called the fight-or-flight response. The enkephalins and enkephalin-containing peptides are related to, but distinct from endogenous peptides named endorphins (which are secreted from the pituitary); all of these peptides bind to opioid receptors and produce analgesic (and other) responses. The hormones are secreted from chromaffin granules; this is where the enzyme dopamine β-hydroxylase catalyses the conversion of dopamine to noradrenaline. Distinct N and E cell forms exist (also Na and A cells in British nomenclature - noradrenaline and adrenaline); the former produce norepinephrine, the latter arise out of N cells through interaction with glucocorticoids, and convert norepinephrine into epinephrine.

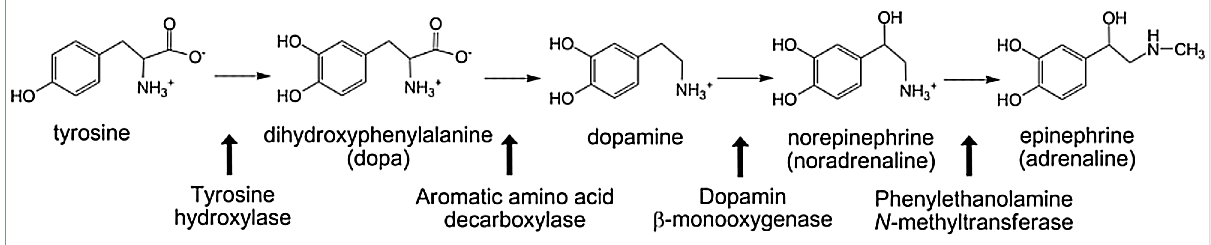
Catecholamine biosynthesis

== Clinical significance ==
Neoplasms arising from these cells are pheochromocytomas (also called chromaffin or sympathetic paragangliomas, in contrast to non-chromaffin or parasympathetic paragangliomas of glomus cells). Sometimes only neoplasms of adrenal origin are named pheochromocytomas, while others are named extra-adrenal paragangliomas.

=== Heart failure ===
Following heart failure, the body increases sympathetic activity to the adrenal medulla as the compensatory mechanism to increase heart rate and cardiac output. This increased sympathetic activity leads to chronically increased synthesis and secretion of catecholamines from the adrenal chromaffin cells. This chronic increase of epinephrine and norepinephrine secretion causes desensitization of the chromaffin cells to catecholamines resulting in a decrease in production and presence of α_{2} adrenergic receptors on their cell membrane. This desensitization and downregulation of α_{2} adrenergic receptors is caused by the upregulation of the enzyme Adrenal G protein coupled receptor kinase 2 (GRK2) which effectively eliminates the normal autocrine-type negative feedback that normally prevents the cells from over producing the catecholamines and replaces it with a positive feedback loop in which increased secretion further elicits more secretion. This upregulation of GRK2 is also accompanied by upregulation and increased production of the enzyme tyrosine hydroxylase, which catalyzes the rate limiting step of catecholamine synthesis.

== History ==
The word "chromaffin" comes from a portmanteau of chromium and affinity. They are named as such because they can be visualised by staining with chromium salts. Chromium salts oxidise and polymerise catecholamines to form a brown color, most strongly in the cells secreting noradrenaline. Chromaffin cells are also called pheochromocytes.

The enterochromaffin cells are so named because of their histological similarity to chromaffin cells (they stain yellow when treated with chromium salts), but their function is quite different and they are not derivatives of the neural crest.

Paraganglia are clusters of either chromaffin cells or glomus cells near sympathetic ganglia.

== See also ==
- List of distinct cell types in the adult human body
- List of human cell types derived from the germ layers
