= Mammary artery =

Mammary artery may refer to:

- the internal thoracic artery (previously known as the internal mammary artery)

The internal thoracic artery is commonly chosen as a graft artery during coronary artery bypass graft surgery.

- the lateral thoracic artery (previously known as the external mammary artery)
