= Aquatic animal =

Animal living mostly or entirely in water

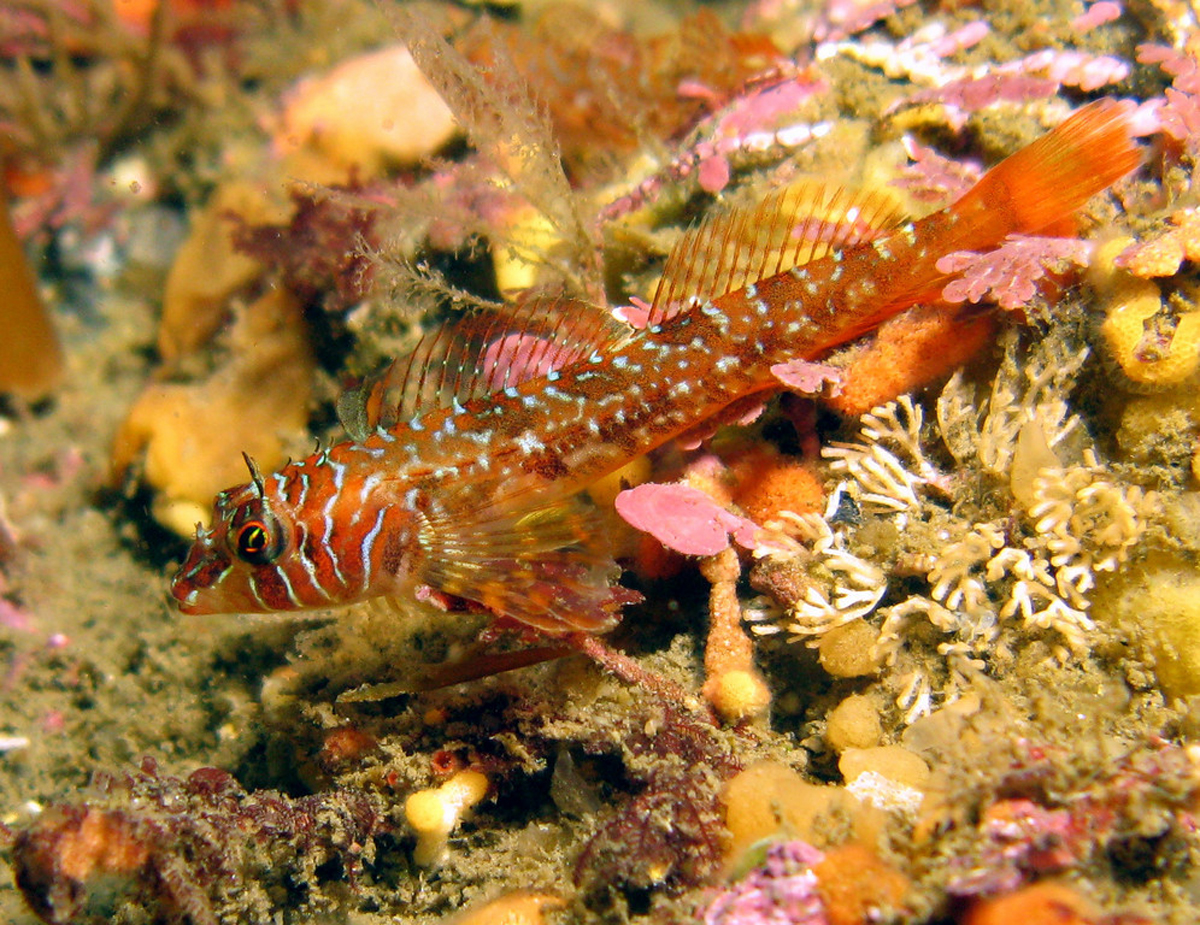
Longfin sculpin (Jordania zonope)

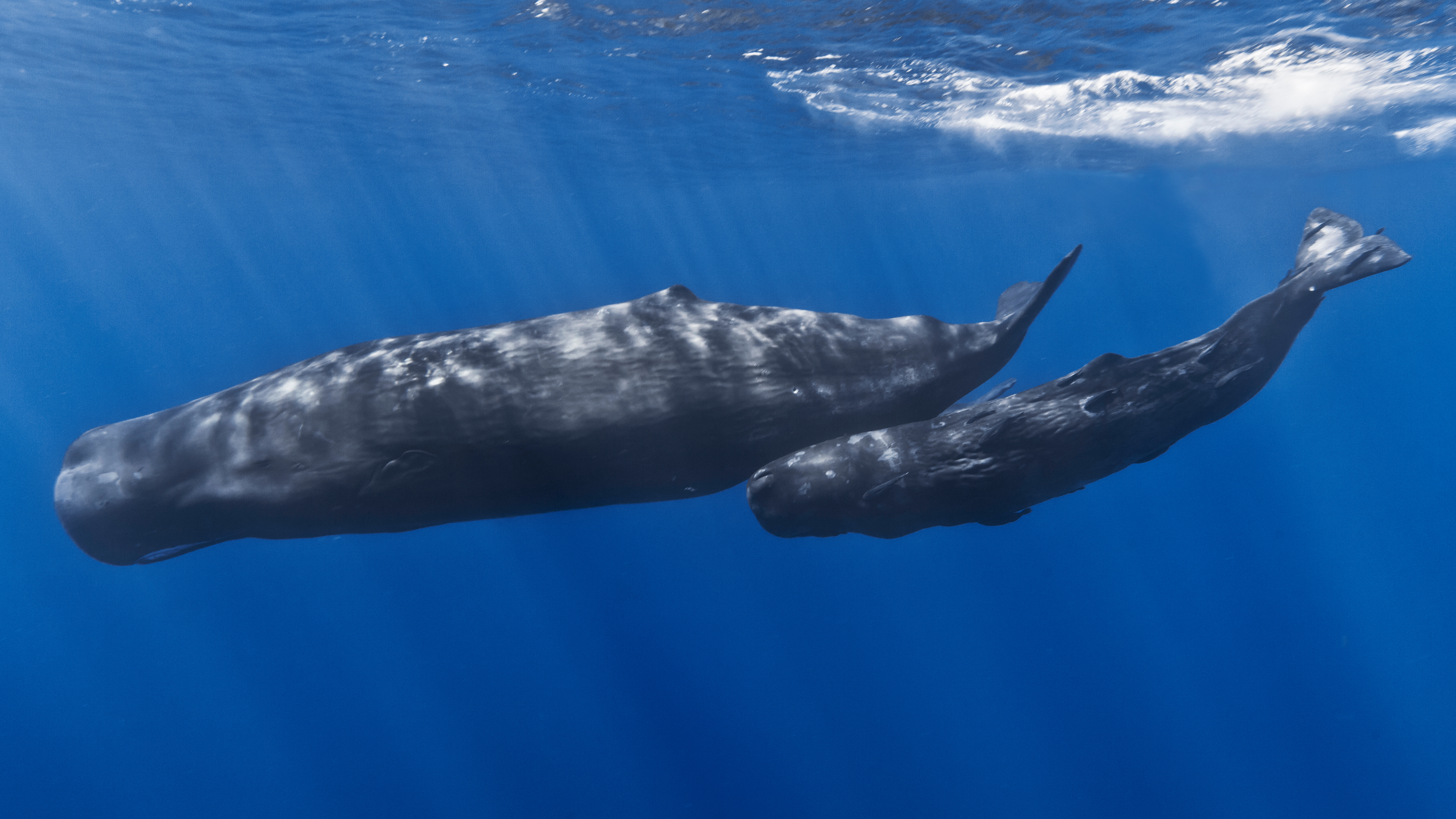
Sperm whales, an example of air-breathing aquatic animals

An aquatic animal is any animal, whether vertebrate or invertebrate, that lives in a body of water for all or most of its lifetime. Aquatic animals generally conduct aquatic respiration by extracting dissolved oxygen in water via specialised respiratory organs called gills, through the skin or across enteral mucosae, although some are secondarily aquatic animals (e.g. marine reptiles and marine mammals) evolved from terrestrial ancestors that re-adapted to aquatic environments, in which case they actually use lungs to breathe air and are essentially holding their breath when living in water. Some species of gastropod mollusc, such as the eastern emerald sea slug, are even capable of kleptoplastic photosynthesis via endosymbiosis with ingested yellow-green algae.

Almost all aquatic animals reproduce in water, either oviparously or viviparously, and many species routinely migrate between different water bodies during their life cycle. Some animals have fully aquatic life stages (typically as eggs and larvae), while as adults they become terrestrial or semi-aquatic after undergoing metamorphosis. Such examples include amphibians such as frogs, many flying insects such as mosquitoes, mayflies, dragonflies, damselflies and caddisflies, as well as some species of cephalopod molluscs such as the algae octopus, which lives in the intertidal zone.

Aquatic animals are a diverse polyphyletic group based purely on the natural environments they inhabit, and many morphological and behavioral similarities among them are the result of convergent evolution. They are distinct from terrestrial and semi-aquatic animals, who can survive away from water bodies, while aquatic animals often die of dehydration or hypoxia after prolonged removal out of water due to either gill failure or compressive asphyxia by their own body weight (as in the case of whale beaching). Along with aquatic plants, algae and microbes, aquatic animals form the food webs of various marine, brackish and freshwater aquatic ecosystems.

== Description ==
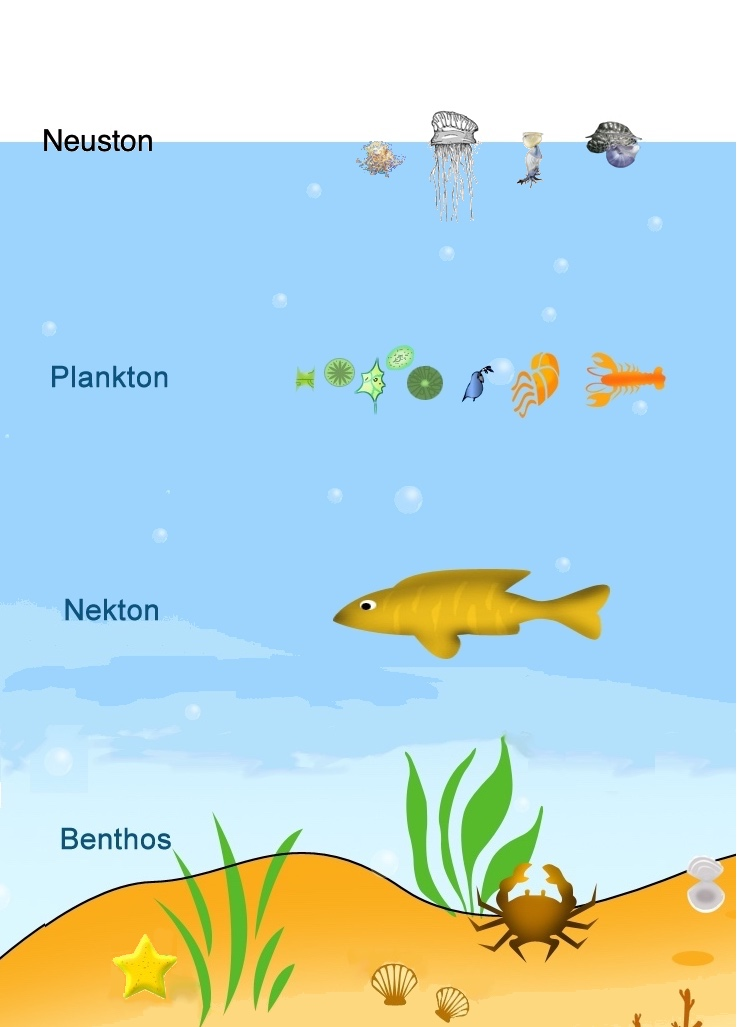
The four main types of aquatic animals: neustons, planktons, nektons and benthos

The term "aquatic animal" can be applied to residents of either freshwater or saltwater environments. However, the adjective "marine" is most commonly used for animals that live in seawater (i.e. oceans and shallow seas) or sometimes brackish water (i.e. estuaries, lagoons, tidal rivers, etc), and "brine" is used for halophilic species that can tolerate hypersaline waterbodies.

Aquatic animals can be separated into four main ecological groups according to their positions within the water column.

- Neustons ("floaters"), more specifically the zooneustons, inhabit the surface ecosystem and use buoyancy and surface tension to stay at the water surface, sometimes with appendages hanging from the underside for foraging (e.g. Portuguese man o' war, chondrophores and the buoy barnacle). They only move around via passive locomotion, meaning they have vagility but no motility.
- Planktons ("drifters"), more specifically the metazoan zooplanktons, are suspended within the water column with no motility (most aquatic larvae) or limited motility (e.g. jellyfish, salps, larvaceans, and escape responses of copepods), causing them to be mostly carried by water currents.
- Nektons ("swimmers") have active motility that are strong enough to propel and overcome the influence of water currents. These are the aquatic animals most familiar to the common knowledge, as their movements are obvious on the macroscopic scale and the cultivation and harvesting of their biomass is most important to humans as seafoods. Nektons often have powerful tails, paddle/fan-shaped appendages with large wetted surfaces (e.g. fins, flippers or webbed feet) and/or jet propulsion (in the case of cephalopods) to achieve aquatic locomotion.
- Benthos ("bottom dwellers") inhabit the benthic zone at the floor of water bodies, which include both shallow sea (coastal, littoral and neritic) and deep sea communities. These animals include sessile organisms (e.g. sponges, sea anemones, corals, sea pens, sea lilies and sea squirts, some of which are reef-builders crucial to the biodiversity of marine ecosystems), sedentary filter feeders (e.g. bivalve molluscs, brachiopods, acorn worms, lancelets) and ambush predators (e.g. flatfishes and bobbit worms, who often burrow or camouflage within the marine sediment), and more actively moving bottom feeders who swim (e.g. demersal fishes) and crawl around (e.g. decapod crustaceans, marine chelicerates, octopus, most non-bivalvian molluscs, echinoderms etc.). Many benthic animals are algivores, detrivores and scavengers who are important basal consumers and intermediate recyclers in the marine nitrogen cycle.

Aquatic animals (especially freshwater animals) are often of special concern to conservationists because of the fragility of their environments. Aquatic animals are subject to pressure from overfishing/hunting, destructive fishing, water pollution, acidification, climate change and competition from invasive species. Many aquatic ecosystems are at risk of habitat destruction/fragmentation, which puts aquatic animals at risk as well. Aquatic animals play an important role in the world. The biodiversity of aquatic animals provide food, energy, and even jobs.

=== Freshwater aquatic animals ===
Fresh water creates a hypotonic environment for aquatic organisms. This is problematic for organisms with pervious skins and gills, whose cell membranes may rupture if excess water is not excreted. Some protists accomplish this using contractile vacuoles, while freshwater fish excrete excess water via the kidney. Although most aquatic organisms have a limited ability to regulate their osmotic balance and therefore can only live within a narrow range of salinity, diadromous fish have the ability to migrate between fresh and saline water bodies. During these migrations they undergo changes to adapt to the surroundings of the changed salinities; these processes are hormonally controlled. The European eel (Anguilla anguilla) uses the hormone prolactin, while in salmon (Salmo salar) the hormone cortisol plays a key role during this process.

Freshwater molluscs include freshwater snails and freshwater bivalves. Freshwater crustaceans include freshwater shrimps, crabs, crayfish and copepods.

=== Air-breathing aquatic animals ===
In addition to water-breathing animals (e.g. fish, most molluscs, etc.), the term "aquatic animal" can be applied to air-breathing secondarily aquatic tetrapods who descended from terrestrial vertebrates and have evolved and fully adapted to aquatic life. The most proliferative extant group are the marine mammals, such as cetaceans (whales, dolphins and porpoises, with some freshwater species) and sirenians (dugongs and manatees), who are too evolved for aquatic life to survive on land at all (where they will die of beaching), as well as the highly aquatically adapted but land-dwelling pinnipeds (true seals, eared seals and the walrus). The term "aquatic mammal" is also applied to riparian mammals like the river otter (Lontra canadensis) and beavers (family Castoridae), although they are technically semiaquatic or amphibious. Unlike the more common gill-bearing aquatic animals, these air-breathing animals have lungs (which are homologous to the swim bladders in bony fish) and need to surface periodically to change breaths, but their ranges are not restricted by oxygen saturation in water.

There are also reptilian animals that are highly evolved for life in water, although most extant aquatic reptiles, including crocodilians, turtles, and water snakes, only inhabit freshwater ecosystems. However, sea turtles, sea snakes, the saltwater crocodile, and the marine iguana live in the sea. Marine reptiles were once a dominant group of ocean predators that altered the marine fauna during the Mesozoic, consisting of ichthyosaurs, plesiosaurs, mosasaurs, thalattosuchians, and sea turtles. Most of these animals died out in the Cretaceous-Paleogene extinction.

Amphibians, while still requiring access to water to inhabit, are separated into their own ecological classification. The majority of amphibians — except the order Gymnophiona (caecilians), which are mainly terrestrial burrowers — have a fully aquatic larval form known as tadpoles, but those from the order Anura (frogs and toads) and some of the order Urodela (salamanders) will metamorphosize into lung-bearing and sometimes skin-breathing terrestrial adults, and most of them may return to the water to breed. Some amphibians, like the axolotl and the mudpuppy, remain aquatic throughout their entire life cycle.

Certain amphibious fish also evolved to breathe air to survive oxygen-deprived waters, such as lungfishes, mudskippers, labyrinth fishes, bichirs, arapaima and walking catfish. Their abilities to breathe atmospheric oxygen are achieved via skin-breathing, enteral respiration, or specialized gill organs such as the labyrinth organ and even primitive lungs (lungfish and bichirs).

Most molluscs have gills, while some freshwater gastropods (e.g. Planorbidae) have evolved pallial lungs and some amphibious species (e.g. Ampullariidae) have both. Many species of octopus have cutaneous respiration that allows them to survive out of water at the intertidal zones, with at least one species (Abdopus aculeatus) being routinely terrestrial hunting crabs among the tidal pools of rocky shores.

== Importance ==
=== Environmental ===
Aquatic animals play an important role for the environment as indicator species, as they are particularly sensitive to deterioration in water quality and climate change. Biodiversity of aquatic animals is also an important factor for the sustainability of aquatic ecosystems as it reflects the food web status and the carrying capacity of the local habitats. Many migratory aquatic animals, predominantly forage fish (such as sardines) and euryhaline fish (such as salmon), are keystone species that accumulate and transfer biomass between marine, freshwater and even to terrestrial ecosystems.

World fisheries and aquaculture production of aquatic animals (1950–2022)

=== Importance to humans ===
==== As a food source ====
Aquatic animal food availability by region, 1961 - 2023

Aquatic animals are important to humans as a source of food (i.e. seafood) and as raw material for fodders (e.g. feeder fish and fish meal), pharmaceuticals (e.g. fish oil, krill oil, cytarabine and bryostatin) and various industrial chemicals (e.g. chitin and bioplastics, formerly also whale oil). The harvesting of aquatic animals, especially finfish, shellfish and inkfish, provides direct and indirect employment to the livelihood of over 500 million people in developing countries, and both the fishing industry and aquaculture make up a major component of the primary sector of the economy. In 2024 aquaculture produced 103 million tonnes of aquatic animals, an all-time record, equivalent to 53% of global aquatic animal output, and over 59% of aquatic animal foods for human consumption.

World catches of aquatic animals in inland waters recorded a new high of 12 million tonnes in 2024, an increase of 5.9% compared to the average of the previous three years. The top five producers of aquatic animals in inland waters (India, Bangladesh, China, Myanmar and Uganda) accounted for 51% of the total. The three major freshwater species groups were “carps, barbels and other cyprinids” (2 million tonnes), “tilapias and other cichlids” (1 million tonnes) and “shads” (0.3 million tonnes). However, these figures may be underestimated as many countries continue to face major difficulties collecting accurate data for inland fisheries.

The value of trade in aquatic animal products is comparable to that of terrestrial meats, and aquatic trade accounts for 9% of total agricultural trade (excluding forestry) and about 1% of total merchandise trade. Aquatic animal foods contributed 15% of animal protein availability globally; and for over 40% of the world’s population they provided at least 20% of this animal protein availability in 2023. About 36% of the 2024 aquatic animal production was traded worldwide. Overall, trade in aquatic products involved 230 countries and territories and generating an estimated USD 186 billion in revenue. In parallel, employment in the primary sector increased to over 65 million workers and supported the livelihoods of more than 600 million people.

The United Nations Food and Agriculture Organization estimates that global consumption of aquatic animals in 2022 was 185 million tonnes (live weight equivalent), an increase of 4% from 2020. The value of the 2022 global trade was estimated at USD 452 billion, comprising US$157 billion for wild fisheries and US$296 billion for aquaculture.

Asian countries accounted for 72% of total aquatic animal production, followed by Latin America and the Caribbean and Europe (9% each), Africa (7%), Northern America (3%) and Oceania (1%). China remains the major producer (36%), followed by India (9%), Indonesia (7%), Viet Nam (5%) and Peru (3%). Together, these five countries accounted for 60% of global output.

Of the total 185 million tonnes of aquatic animals produced in 2022, about 164.6 million tonnes (89%) were destined for human consumption, equivalent to an estimated 20.7 kg per capita, this increased to 21kg in 2024. The remaining 20.8 million tonnes were destined for non-food uses, to produce mainly fishmeal and fish oil. In 2022, China remained the major producer (36% of the total), followed by India (8%), Indonesia (7%), Vietnam (5%) and Peru (3%). Utilization and processing of aquatic products increased in 2024 compared to previous years, making 89% (174 million tonnes) of global aquatic animal production available for human consumption in 2024. The remaining volume (11%) was used for non-food purposes, mainly to produce fishmeal and fish oil. The largest share (44%) of aquatic animal foods was distributed in live, fresh or chilled form, followed by frozen (35%), prepared and preserved (12%), and cured (10%), comprising drying, salting, fermentation and smoking.

Per capita availability of aquatic animal foods by country, 2023

In 2024 Asia contributed 89% of the total production, followed by Latin America and the Caribbean (4%), Europe (3%), Africa (2%), Northern America (1%) and Oceania (0.2%). The top five producing countries were China (56% of the total), India (12%), Indonesia (6%), Viet Nam (5%) and Bangladesh (3%). Together, these five countries accounted for 82% of the total. A large share (64 million tonnes or 62% of the total) was farmed in inland waters, dominated by finfish (89%), followed by crustaceans (9%), aquatic turtles and frogs (1%), molluscs (0.3%) and other invertebrates (0.1%). Marine and coastal aquaculture produced 38 million tonnes of aquatic animals, mainly molluscs (53%), followed by finfish (24%), crustaceans (22%) and marine invertebrates (2%). In addition, 39 million tonnes of algae were farmed, mainly in marine environments. The share of fed aquaculture continued to increase, reaching 72% of global aquaculture production of aquatic animals. However, the volume of reduction fisheries used in animal feeds remains significantly lower than in previous decades.

World fisheries and aquaculture production of aquatic animals by area and relative shares of world production, 2022

Total fish production in 2016 reached an all-time high of 171 million tonnes, of which 88% was utilized for direct human consumption, resulting in a record-high per capita consumption of 20.3 kg (45 lb). Since 1961 the annual global growth in fish consumption has been twice as high as population growth. While annual growth of aquaculture has declined in recent years, significant double-digit growth is still recorded in some countries, particularly in Africa and Asia. Overfishing and destructive fishing practices fuelled by commercial incentives have reduced fish stocks beyond sustainable levels in many world regions, causing the fishery industry to maladaptively fishing down the food web. It was estimated in 2014 that global fisheries were adding US$270 billion a year to global GDP, but by full implementation of sustainable fishing, that figure could rise by as much as US$50 billion. UN Food and Agriculture Organization projects world production of aquatic animals to reach 205 million tonnes by 2032.

Where sex-disaggregated data are available, approximately 24% of the total workforce were women; of these, 53% were employed in the sector on a full-time basis, a great improvement since 1995, when only 32% of women were employed full time.

Aquatic animal are highly perishable and several chemical and biological changes take place immediately after death; this can result in spoilage and food safety risks if good handling and preservation practices are not applied all along the supply chain. These practices are based on temperature reduction (chilling and freezing), heat treatment (canning, boiling and smoking), reduction of available water (drying, salting and smoking) and changing of the storage environment (vacuum packing, modified atmosphere packaging and refrigeration). Aquatic animal products also require special facilities such as cold storage and refrigerated transport, and rapid delivery to consumers.

==== Recreational fishing ====
In addition to commercial and subsistence fishing, recreational fishing is a popular pastime in both developed and developing countries, and the manufacturing, retail and service sectors associated with recreational fishing have together conglomerated into a multibillion-dollar industry. In 2014 alone, around 11 million saltwater sportfishing participants the United States generated USD$58 billion of retail revenue (comparatively, commercial fishing generated US$141 billion that same year). In 2021, the total revenue of recreational fishing industry in the United States overtook those of Lockheed Martin, Intel, Chrysler and Google; and together with personnel salary (about US$39.5 billion) and various tolls and fees collected by fisheries management agencies (about US$17 billion), contributed almost US$129 billion to the GDP of the United States, roughly 1% of the national GDP and more than the economic sum of 17 U.S. states.

== See also ==
- Aquatic ecosystem
- Aquatic locomotion
- Aquatic mammal
- Aquatic plant
- Freshwater snail
- Marine biology
- Marine invertebrates
- Marine mammal
- Marine vertebrate
- Terrestrial animal
- Terrestrial ecosystem
- Terrestrial locomotion
- Terrestrial plant
- Wetland – Ecosystem that is flooded or saturated with water
- Wetland indicator status
- Zoology

== Sources ==
This article incorporates text from a free content work. Licensed under CC BY 4.0 (license statement/permission). Text taken from The State of World Fisheries and Aquaculture 2026, Food and Agriculture Organization of the United Nations.

This article incorporates text from a free content work. Licensed under CC BY 4.0 (license statement/permission). Text taken from The State of World Fisheries and Aquaculture 2024, FAO.

This article incorporates text from a free content work. Licensed under CC BY 4.0 (license statement/permission). Text taken from The State of World Fisheries and Aquaculture 2026, Food and Agriculture Organization of the United Nations.
