= Aquatic respiration =

Process whereby an aquatic animal obtains oxygen from water

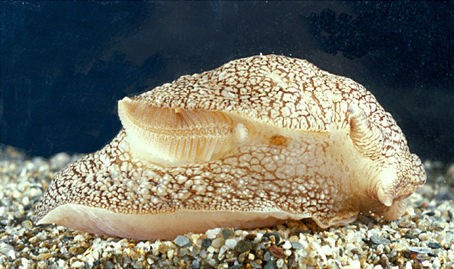
Sea slugs respire through a gill (or ctenidium)

Aquatic respiration is the process whereby an aquatic organism exchanges respiratory gases with water, obtaining oxygen from oxygen dissolved in water and excreting carbon dioxide and some other metabolic waste products into the water.

== Unicellular and simple small organisms ==
In very small animals, plants and bacteria, simple diffusion of gaseous metabolites is sufficient for respiratory function and no special adaptations are found to aid respiration. Passive diffusion or active transport are also sufficient mechanisms for many larger aquatic animals such as many worms, jellyfish, sponges, bryozoans and similar organisms. In such cases, no specific respiratory organs or organelles are found.

== Higher plants ==
Although higher plants typically use carbon dioxide and excrete oxygen during photosynthesis, they also respire and, particularly during darkness, many plants excrete carbon dioxide and require oxygen to maintain normal functions. In fully submerged aquatic higher plants specialised structures such as stoma on leaf surfaces control gas interchange. In many species, these structures can be controlled to be open or closed depending on environmental conditions. In conditions of high light intensity and relatively high carbonate ion concentrations, oxygen may be produced in sufficient quantities to form gaseous bubbles on the surface of leaves and may produce oxygen super-saturation in the surrounding water body.

== Animals ==
All animals that practice truly aquatic respiration are poikilothermic. All aquatic homeothermic animals and birds including cetaceans and penguins are air breathing despite a fully aquatic life-style.

=== Echinoderms ===
Echinoderms have a specialised water vascular system which provides a number of functions including providing the hydraulic power for tube feet but also serves to convey oxygenated sea water into the body and carry waste water out again. In many genera, the water enters through a madreporite, a sieve like structure on the upper surface but may also enter via ciliary action in the tube feet or via special cribiform organelles.

=== Molluscs ===
Molluscs commonly possess gills that allow exchange of respiratory gases from an aqueous environment into the circulatory system. These animals possess a heart that pumps blood which contains hemocyanin as its oxygen-capturing molecule. The respiratory system of gastropods can include either gills or a lung.

=== Arthropods ===
Aquatic arthropods generally possess some form of gills in which gas exchange takes place by diffusing through the exoskeleton. Others may breathe atmospheric air while remaining submerged, via breathing tubes or trapped air bubbles, though some aquatic insects may remain submerged indefinitely and respire using a plastron. A number of insects have an aquatic juvenile phase and an adult phase on land. In these case adaptions for life in water are lost at the final ecdysis. A number of orders of insects such as mayflies, caddis flies and stone flies have aquatic juvenile stages while some orders such as Lepidoptera have just a few examples such as China mark moths. A very few arachnids have adopted an aquatic life style including the diving bell spider. In all cases, oxygen is provided from air trapped by hairs around the animal's body.

=== Fish ===
Most fish exchange gases using gills on either side of the pharynx (throat), forming the splanchnocranium, the portion of the skeleton where the cartilage of the cranium converges into the cartilage of the pharynx and its associated parts. Gills are tissues which consist of threadlike structures called filaments. These filaments have many functions and are involved in ion and water transfer as well as oxygen, carbon dioxide, acid and ammonia exchange. Each filament contains a capillary network that provides a large surface area for the exchange of gases and ions. Fish exchange gases by pulling oxygen-rich water through their mouths and pumping it over their gills. In species like the spiny dogfish and other sharks and rays, a spiracle exists near the top of the head that pumps water into the gills when the animal is not in motion. In some fish, capillary blood flows in the opposite direction to the water, causing countercurrent exchange. The muscles on the sides of the pharynx push the oxygen-depleted water out the gill openings. In bony fish, the pumping of oxygen-poor water is aided by a bone that surrounds the gills called the operculum.

==== Ram ventilation ====
Ram ventilation is a common form of respiration in many fish species where the fish continuously keeps its mouth open and swims forward, thus pushing water across its gills and into its buccal cavity. Most species use this method in conjunction with buccal pumping, a similar respiration method that does not require constant movement, and draws water into their buccal cavity and gills by using cheek muscles. These species are considered facultative ram ventilators.

Many species that can use both buccal pumping and ram ventilation can switch between the two if they reach speeds where ram ventilation is more efficient. When swimming speeds reach 50-80 cm/s (or ~1.1 - 1.7 miles per hour), the buccal pressure can be elevated enough to adequately ventilate the gills at a rate that meets oxygen requirements. When this occurs, ram ventilation is actually more efficient and theoretically lowers the metabolic costs associated with ventilation.

There are also some species of fish known as "obligate ram ventilators" who have to keep in constant motion to avoid suffocation. These species cannot use other methods of respiration. Two of the most well known species that are obligate ram ventilators are several species of sharks as well as most tuna species.

=== Amphibians ===
Both the lungs and the skin serve as respiratory organs in amphibians. The skin of these animals is highly vascularized and moist, with moisture maintained via secretion of mucus from specialized cells. While the lungs are of primary importance to breathing control, the unique properties of cutaneous respiration supplements rapid gas exchange when amphibians are submerged in oxygen-rich water.

=== Aquatic reptiles, birds and mammals ===
All aquatic amniotes (reptiles, birds and mammals) have thick and impermeable cutes that preclude cutaneous respiration, and thus rely solely on the lungs to breathe air. When underwater, the animal is essentially holding its breath and has to routinely return to the surface to breathe in new air. Therefore, all amniote animals, even those that spend more time in water than out, are susceptible to drowning if they cannot reach the surface to breathe.

The anatomical structure of the lungs is less complex in reptiles than in mammals, with reptiles lacking the very extensive bronchial tree found in mammalian lungs. Gas exchange in reptiles still occurs in alveoli, but reptiles do not possess a diaphragm, therefore ventilation occurs via a change in the volume of the body cavity which is controlled by contraction of intercostal muscles in all reptiles except turtles. In turtles, contraction of specific pairs of flank muscles governs inspiration or expiration.

Diving birds and pelagic seabirds breathe air using lungs like reptiles and mammals, but avian lungs are fairly rigid structures that do not expand and contract as elastically. Instead, the structures that act as bellows that ventilate the lungs are the avascular air sacs, which are distributed throughout much of the birds' bodies and move air unidirectionally through the parabronchi, where gas exchange happens. Although bird lungs are smaller than those of mammals of comparable size, the air sacs account for 15% of the total body volume, whereas in mammals, the alveoli (which act as the bellows) constitute only 7% of the total body volume. Like their reptilian cousins, birds also lack a diaphragm and thus rely on the intercostal and abdominal muscles to change the volume of the entire thoracoabdominal cavity. The active phase of respiration in birds is exhalation, which requires contracting of respiratory muscles, while the relaxation of these muscles causes inhalation.

== Gills ==
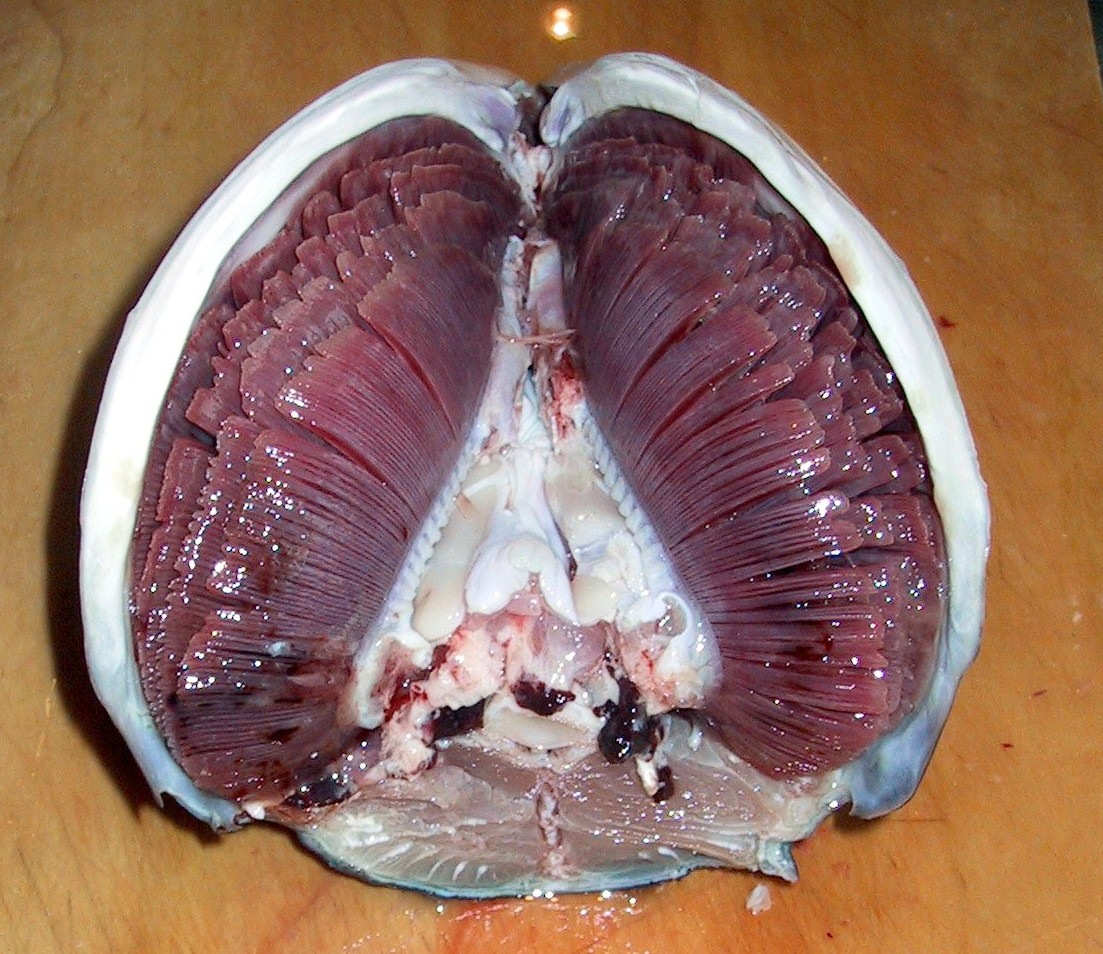
Posterior view of the gills of a tuna

Many aquatic animals have developed gills for respiration which are specifically adapted to their function. In fish, for example, they have:

- A large surface area to allow as much oxygen to enter the gills as possible because more of the gas comes into contact with the membrane
- Good blood supply to maintain the concentration gradient needed
- Thin membrane to allow for a short diffusion pathway
- Each gill arch has two rows (hemibranchs) of gill filaments
- Each gill filament has many lamellae

In osteichthyes, the gills contain 4 gill arches on each side of the head, two on each side for chondrichthyes or seven gill baskets on each side of the fish's head in lampreys. In fish, the long bony cover for the gill (the operculum) can be used for pushing water. Some fish pump water using the operculum. Without an operculum, other methods, such as ram ventilation, are required. Some species of sharks use this system. When they swim, water flows into the mouth and across the gills. Because these sharks rely on this technique, they must keep swimming in order to respire.

Bony fish use countercurrent flow to maximize the intake of oxygen that can diffuse through the gill. Countercurrent flow occurs when deoxygenated blood moves through the gill in one direction while oxygenated water moves through the gill in the opposite direction. This mechanism maintains the concentration gradient thus increasing the efficiency of the respiration process as well and prevents the oxygen levels from reaching an equilibrium. Cartilaginous fish do not have a countercurrent flow system as they lack bones which are needed to have the opened out gill that bony fish have.

== Control of respiration ==
In fish neurons located in the brainstem of fish are responsible for the genesis of the respiratory rhythm. The position of these neurons is slightly different from the centers of respiratory genesis in mammals but they are located in the same brain compartment, which has caused debates about the homology of respiratory centers between aquatic and terrestrial species. In both aquatic and terrestrial respiration, the exact mechanisms by which neurons can generate this involuntary rhythm are still not completely understood (see Involuntary control of respiration).

The respiratory rhythm is modulated to adapt to the oxygen consumption of the body. As observed in mammals, fish “breathe” faster and heavier when they do physical exercise. The mechanisms by which these changes occur have been subject to debate . The views can be classified as either that the major part of the respiratory changes are pre-programmed in the brain, which would imply that neurons from locomotion centers of the brain connect to respiratory centers in anticipation of movements, or that the major part of the respiratory changes result from the detection of muscle contraction, and that respiration is adapted as a consequence of muscular contraction and oxygen consumption. The latter view would imply that the brain possesses some kind of detection mechanisms that would trigger a respiratory response when muscular contraction occurs.

Many now agree that both mechanisms are probably present and complementary, or working alongside a mechanism that can detect changes in oxygen and/or carbon dioxide blood saturation.

== See also ==
- Anaerobic respiration – Respiration using electron acceptors other than oxygen
- Cellular respiration – Process of releasing energy from nutrients using inorganic electron acceptors
- Control of ventilation – Breathing control
- Ecosystem respiration – Oxidation of organic compounds within an ecosystem
- Maintenance respiration – Amount of cellular respiration needed for an organism to maintain itself
- Respiratory system – Biological system in animals and plants for gas exchange
