= Medipines =

American medical equipment company

- Industry: Medical equipment
- Headquarters: Orange County, California, U.S.
- Key people: Steve Lee (CEO)
- Website: www.medipines.com

Medipines is an American medical equipment maker which is based in Orange County, California, United States. It is known for its device, AGM100, which is approved for respiratory diagnosis and identifying the symptoms of COVID-19 using parameters such as oxygen saturation levels. The device is being used in the Canada and the U.S.

== History ==
MediPines was incorporated in 2013. They are known for their device, AGM100, which provides non-invasive pulmonary gas exchange measurements in a short period of time. Approved by FDA, the device was developed in California and has been tested at the University of British Columbia. It is in use in Canadian hospitals.

In July 2020, it received the National Consortium for Pediatric Device award for developing a monitor device that displays a critical analysis of patients' breathing samples.

In August 2021, the AGM100 was included in the WHO Compendium.
