= Huff and puff apparatus =

School laboratory device

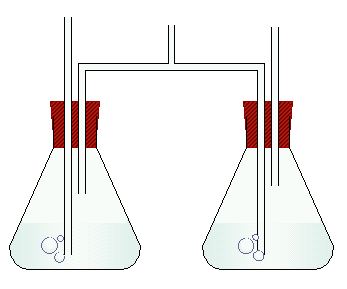
Huff and Puff Apparatus respiration demonstration

The huff and puff apparatus is used in school biology and chemistry labs to demonstrate that carbon dioxide is a product of respiration.

A sample procedure is as follows: A pupil breathes in and out of the middle tube. The glass tubing is arranged in such a way that one flask bubbles as the pupils breathes in, the other as the pupil breathes out. A suitable carbon dioxide indicator, such as limewater, cabbage juice, or bicarbonate indicator shows the increased presence of carbon dioxide in the outgoing breath. This turns the limewater into milky white substance.

== See also ==
- Respiration (physiology)
