= Respiration (physiology) =

Exchange of gases between environment and tissues

In physiology, respiration is a biological process that facilitates the transport of oxygen from the outside environment to bodily tissues (through inhalation), and the removal of carbon dioxide of an organism (through exhalation), using a respiratory system.

The physiological definition of respiration differs from the biological definition of cellular respiration, which is a metabolic process by which an organism obtains energy (in the form of ATP and NADPH) by oxidizing nutrients and releasing waste products. Although physiologic respiration is necessary to sustain cellular respiration and thus life in animals, the processes are distinct: cellular respiration takes place in individual cells of the organism, while physiologic respiration concerns the diffusion and transport of metabolites between the organism and the external environment.

Exchange of gases in the lung occurs by ventilation (commonly called breathing) and perfusion. Ventilation refers to the in-and-out movement of air of the lungs and perfusion is the pulmonary circulation of blood in the capillaries. In mammals, physiological respiration involves respiratory cycles of inhaled and exhaled breaths. Inhalation (breathing in) is usually an active movement that brings air into the lungs where the process of gas exchange takes place between the air in the alveoli and the blood in the pulmonary capillaries. Contraction of the diaphragm muscle causes a pressure variation, which is equal to the pressures caused by elastic, resistive and inertial components of the respiratory system. In contrast, exhalation (breathing out) is usually a passive process, though there are many exceptions: when generating functional overpressure (speaking, singing, humming, laughing, blowing, snorting, sneezing, coughing, powerlifting); when exhaling underwater (swimming, diving); at high levels of physiological exertion (running, climbing, throwing) where more rapid gas exchange is necessitated; or in some forms of breath-controlled meditation. Speaking and singing in humans requires sustained breath control that many mammals are not capable of performing.

The process of breathing does not fill the alveoli with atmospheric air during each inhalation (about 350 ml per breath), but the inhaled air is carefully diluted and thoroughly mixed with a large volume of gas (about 2.5 liters in adult humans) known as the functional residual capacity which remains in the lungs after each exhalation, and whose gaseous composition differs markedly from that of the ambient air. Physiological respiration involves the mechanisms that ensure that the composition of the functional residual capacity is kept constant, and equilibrates with the gases dissolved in the pulmonary capillary blood, and thus throughout the body. Thus, in precise usage, the words breathing and ventilation are hyponyms, not synonyms, of respiration; but this prescription is not consistently followed, even by most health care providers, because the term respiratory rate (RR) is a well-established term in health care, even though it would need to be consistently replaced with ventilation rate if the precise usage were to be followed. During respiration the C-H bonds are broken by oxidation-reduction reaction and so carbon dioxide and water are also produced. The cellular energy-yielding process is called cellular respiration.

== Classifications of respiration ==
There are several ways to classify the physiology of respiration:

=== By body plan ===
- Aquatic respiration
- Buccal pumping
- Cutaneous respiration
- Intestinal respiration
- Respiratory system

=== By mechanism ===
- Apnea
- Arterial blood gas
- Breathing
- Control of respiration
- Gas exchange

=== By experiments ===
- Huff and puff apparatus
- Spirometry
- Selected ion flow tube mass spectrometry

=== By intensive care and emergency medicine ===
- CPR
- ECMO
- General anaesthesia
- Intensive care medicine
- Intubation
- Iron lung
- Laryngoscope
- Life support
- Liquid breathing
- Mechanical ventilation
- Medical ventilator
- Oxygen toxicity

=== By other medical topics ===
- Barotrauma
- Breathing gases
- Carbon dioxide poisoning
- Carbon monoxide poisoning
- Decompression sickness
- Gas embolism
- HPNS
- Hyperbaric oxygen therapy
- Hypoxia
- Nitrogen narcosis
- Oxygen equivalent
- Oxygen toxicity
- Respiratory therapy

== Additional images ==
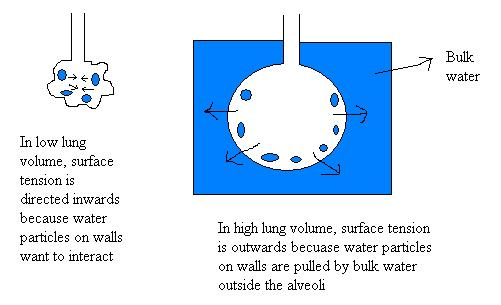

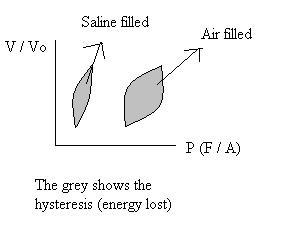

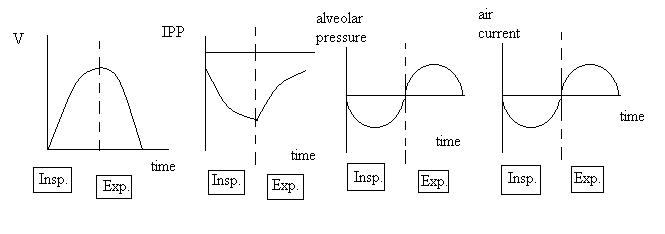

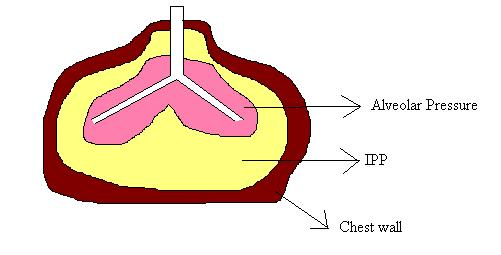

== See also ==
- Diffusing capacity – Measure of the transfer of gas from the lung to red blood cells
- Outline of biology
- Mechanical ventilation – Method to mechanically assist or replace spontaneous breathing
- Respiratory sounds
- Body fluid
- Biofluid dynamics
