= Cutaneous respiration =

Gas exchange across the skin of an organism

Cutaneous respiration, or cutaneous gas exchange (sometimes called skin breathing), is a form of respiration in which gas exchange occurs across the skin or outer integument of an organism rather than gills or lungs. Cutaneous respiration may be the sole method of gas exchange, or may accompany other forms, such as ventilation. Cutaneous respiration occurs in a wide variety of organisms, including insects, amphibians, fish, sea snakes, turtles, and to a lesser extent in mammals.

== Physical constraints ==
Gas exchange in cutaneous respiration is controlled by three factors:

- Ventilation: the rate of delivery of respiratory medium (water or air) to the respiratory surface
- Diffusion: the passage of gases through the skin
- Convection: the carrying of dissolved gases towards or away from the skin

== Taxonomic diversity in chordates ==
=== Fish ===
Cutaneous respiration occurs in a variety of marine, intertidal, and freshwater fish. For aquatic respiration, fish respire primarily via gills but cutaneous respiration may account for 5 to 40 percent of the total respiration, depending on species and temperature. Cutaneous respiration is more important in species that breathe air, such as mudskippers and reedfish, and in such species may account for almost 50 percent of total respiration.

=== Amphibians ===
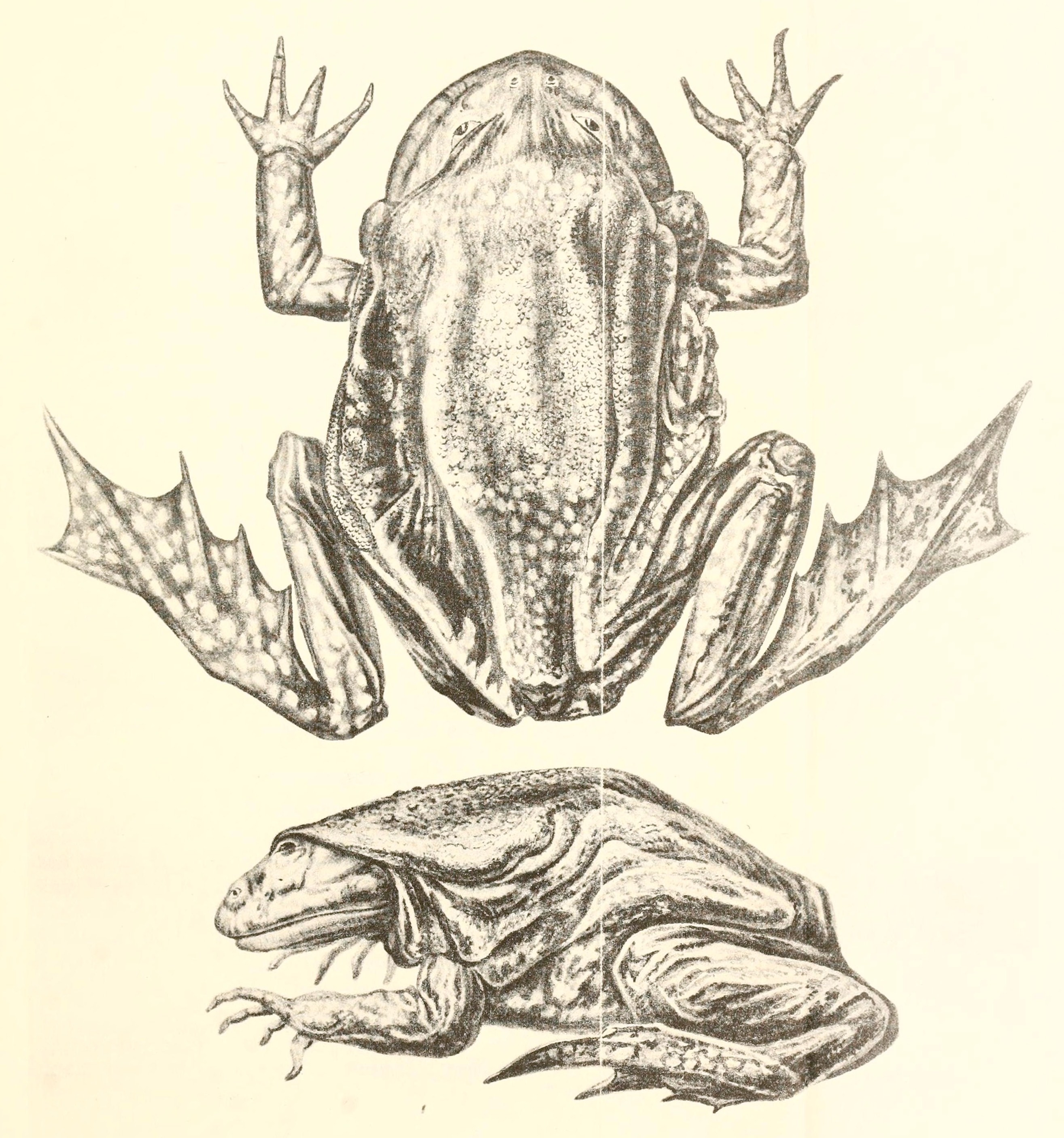
The prominent skin folds of Telmatobius culeus increase surface area for cutaneous gas exchange

The skin of amphibians is a major site of respiration in all species for which measurements are available. Cutaneous respiration is the sole respiratory mode of lungless salamanders (family Plethodontidae) which lack lungs entirely yet constitute the largest family of salamanders. Cutaneous respiration in frogs and other amphibians may be the primary respiratory mode during colder temperatures.

Some amphibians utilizing cutaneous respiration have extensive folds of skin to increase the rate of respiration. Examples include the hellbender salamander and the Lake Titicaca water frog. Cutaneous respiration in hellbenders accounts for more than 90 percent of oxygen uptake and carbon dioxide excretion.

=== Reptiles ===
Being covered in scales largely precludes cutaneous respiration in reptiles, but gas exchange may occur between scales or areas with reduced scales. Some turtles rely on cutaneous respiration from enteral respiration around the cloaca during underwater hibernation.

In some sea snakes, cutaneous respiration can account for up to 30 percent of total oxygen uptake and is important when diving, during which blood is shunted away from the lungs and towards capillaries in the skin, in some cases causing the skin to turn pink.

=== Mammals ===
Mammals are endotherms ("warm-blooded") and have higher metabolic demands than ectothermic ("cold-blooded") vertebrates, and the skin is thicker and more impermeable than other vertebrates, which precludes the skin as a major source of gas exchange. However, small amounts of respiration may occur, and in bats, the highly vascularized wings may account for up to 12 percent of carbon dioxide excretion. In humans and most other mammals, cutaneous respiration accounts for only 1 to 2 percent. In newborns of some marsupial species, the percentage of cutaneous respiration increases dramatically due to immature muscular development. Up to 95% of gas exchange via skin has been observed in newborn Julia Creek dunnarts.

== See also ==
- Enteral respiration
