= Oxygen equivalent =

Metric for oxygen available at different pressures

Oxygen equivalent compares the relative amount of oxygen available for respiration at a variable pressure to that available at SATP. As external respiration depends on the exchange of gases due to partial pressures across a semipermeable membrane and normally occurs at SATP, an oxygen equivalent may aid in recognizing and managing variable oxygen availability during procedures such as hyperbaric oxygen therapy or medical air transport.

It does so by expressing oxygen concentration as a ratio of the partial pressure of oxygen at a given altitude or pressure to Standard Atmospheric Pressure; rather than as a ratio of the PO_{2} at a given pressure to the total pressure of the gas mixture. The latter would generally be 0.2095, the atmospheric concentration by volume of O_{2}, although FO_{2} and P_{atm} vary for extraterrestrials. Calculations occur as follows:

Let O_{2}E be oxygen equivalent, FO_{2} be the fractional concentration of oxygen, P_{atm} (generally 760 mmHg, barring intergalactic travel), P_{b} be the barometric pressure, and dP be the change in pressure at a given altitude. Then,

O_{2}E = FO_{2}(P_{b} + dP)/ P_{atm}

It is worthwhile to note that pressures may often be expressed in units of distance such as feet when diving. For this, note that descending 33 ft in salt water or 33.9 ft in fresh water results in a change of 1 atm, so distance and pressure are used interchangeably in this context.
