= Enteral respiration =

Respiration using gas exchange in the enteral system

Enteral respiration, also referred to as cloacal respiration or intestinal respiration, is a form of respiration in which gas exchange occurs across the epithelia of the enteral system, usually in the caudal cavity (cloaca). This is used in various species as an alternative respiration mechanism in hypoxic environments as a means to supplement blood oxygen.

== Turtles ==
Some turtles, especially those specialized in diving, are highly reliant on cloacal respiration during dives. They accomplish this by having a pair of accessory air bladders connected to the cloaca which can absorb oxygen from the water.

== Sea cucumbers ==
Sea cucumbers use cloacal respiration via a pair of "respiratory trees" that branch in the cloaca just inside the anus, so that they "breathe" by drawing water in through the anus, extracting dissolved oxygen from water, and then expelling it. The "trees" consist of a series of narrow tubules branching from a common duct, and lie on either side of the digestive tract. Gas exchange occurs across the thin walls of the tubules, to and from the fluid of the main body cavity.

== Other animals ==
Various fish, as well as polychaete worms and even crabs, are specialized to take advantage of the constant flow of water through the cloacal respiratory tree of sea cucumbers while simultaneously gaining the protection of living within the sea cucumber itself. At night, many of these species emerge from the anus of the sea cucumber in search of food.

The pond loach is able to respond to the periodic drying in their native habitats by burrowing into the mud and exchanging gas through the posterior end of their alimentary canal.

Studies have shown that mammals are capable of performing intestinal respiration to a limited degree in a laboratory setting. Mice subjected to hypoxic conditions and supplied oxygen through their intestines survived an average of 18 minutes compared to 11 minutes in the control group. In 2024 Ig Nobel Prize an award in physiology has been given to a study proving that pigs are capable of this as well. When the intestinal lining was abraded before oxygen was introduced, most of the animals survived for at least 50 minutes. Investigations are planned regarding the effectiveness of the strategy and the feasibility of application to humans. It has potential application to people with a respiratory disease or lung damage. A first-in-human trial of the safety of this application of perfluorocarbons was completed in 2025.

== See also ==
- Cutaneous respiration
