= Breath control =

The term breath control may mean:

- Anapanasati Buddhist breath meditation practice
- Pranayama, a yogic technique for controlling breathing
- Qigong breathing practice
- Xingqi (circulating breath), Daoist breath-control technique
- Vocal technique used in singing
- Breath Control: The History of the Human Beat Box
- Erotic asphyxiation, a BDSM sexual technique where one partner controls the breathing or airway of the other. When used as a self-induced technique for sexual pleasure via breath control it is called autoerotic asphyxiation.
- Wind controller, an electronic wind instrument.
