= Bicarbonate indicator =

Type of pH indicator

A hydrogencarbonate indicator (hydrogencarbonate indicator) is a type of pH indicator that is sensitive enough to show a color change as the concentration of carbon dioxide gas in an aqueous solution increases. The indicator is used in photosynthesis and respiration experiments to determine whether carbon dioxide is being released. It is also used to test the carbon dioxide content during gaseous exchange of organisms.

When the carbon dioxide content is higher than 0.03%, the initial red colour changes to yellow as the pH becomes more acidic. If the carbon dioxide content is lower than 0.03%, it changes from red to magenta and, at very low carbon dioxide concentrations, to purple. Carbon dioxide, even in the concentrations found in exhaled air, dissolves in the indicator to form carbonic acid, a weak acid, which lowers the pH and produces the characteristic colour change. A colour change to purple during photosynthesis indicates a reduction in the percentage of carbon dioxide and is sometimes incorrectly inferred to indicate the production of oxygen, but there is no direct evidence for this conclusion.

Great care must be taken to avoid acidic or alkaline contamination of the apparatus in such experiments, since the test is not directly specific to gases like carbon dioxide.

== Composition ==
Two solutions are prepared separately:

- Solution A: 0.02 g of thymol blue, 0.01 g cresol red and 2 mL of ethanol
- Solution B: 0.8 g of sodium bicarbonate, 7.48 g of potassium chloride and 90 mL of water
- Mix Solution A and B and mix 9 mL of the mixed solution to 1000 mL of distilled water.
- This method to determinate the concentration of bicarbonates and carbonates is also called "Magni's method."

== Color change ==
Content of CO_{2}	> 0.04%	= 0.04%	< 0.04%
Color	Yellow	Red	Purple
