= Respiratory system of gastropods =

Aspect of gastropod anatomy

The respiratory system of gastropods varies greatly in form. These variations were once used as a basis for dividing the group into subclasses. The majority of marine gastropods breathe through a single gill, supplied with oxygen by a current of water through the mantle cavity. This current is U-shaped, so that it also flushes waste products away from the anus, which is located above the animal's head, and would otherwise cause a problem with fouling.

In the pulmonate gastropods, which are found on both land and in freshwater, the gill has been replaced by a simple lung.

== With gills ==
=== With filamentous gills ===
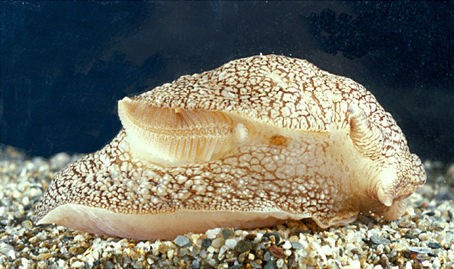
The sea slug Pleurobranchaea meckelii respires using a gill which is visible in this view of the right side of the animal

In gastropods in many ancient lineages, the gills are bipectinate, having an overall shape that is similar to a bird's feather, with narrow filaments projecting either side of a central stalk.

Gastropods such as abalone and keyhole limpets have two gills, which is believed to be the arrangement in the earliest fossil gastropods. The water current to supply these gills is evacuated through a slit or notch in the upper surface of the shell, below which the anus opens.

In most other gastropods, the right gill has been lost. In groups such as the turban shells the gill still retains its primitive bipectinate form, and in these animals, the water current is oblique, entering the mantle cavity on the left side of the head, flowing over the gill, and then being flushed out on the right side. The anus is also on the right side of the body, so that waste matter is efficiently carried away.

Bipectinate gills have to be supported by membranes, and these can become fouled with debris and sediment, restricting such gastropods to relatively clean-water environments, such as water flowing over solid rock. In living gastropods, a unipectinate arrangement is more common, allowing species to invade muddy or sandy environments. This type of gill is firmly anchored to the mantle wall along its length, with a single row of filaments projecting down into the water stream.

Unipectinate gills are found in a wide range of snails, including marine, freshwater, and even terrestrial forms. Examples include periwinkles, conches, and whelks. The water current is oblique, as it is in the turban shells, but many have developed a siphon formed from the rolled-up margin of the mantle. The siphon sucks in water to the mantle cavity, and may be long enough to extend through the substrate in burrowing species. In one amphibious group, the Ampullariidae, the mantle cavity is divided into two, with a unipectinate gill on one side, and a lung on the other, so that these snails can respire using air or water.

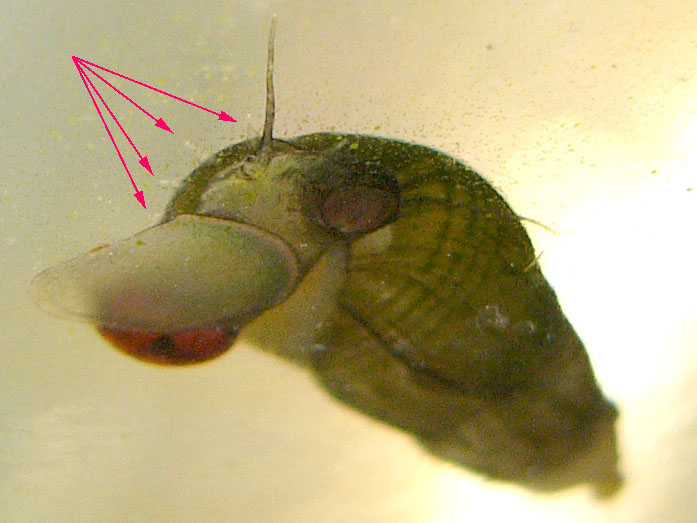
Freshwater snail Melanoides tuberculata. Arrows are pointing to the pallial tentacles for breathing.

=== Other gill arrangements ===
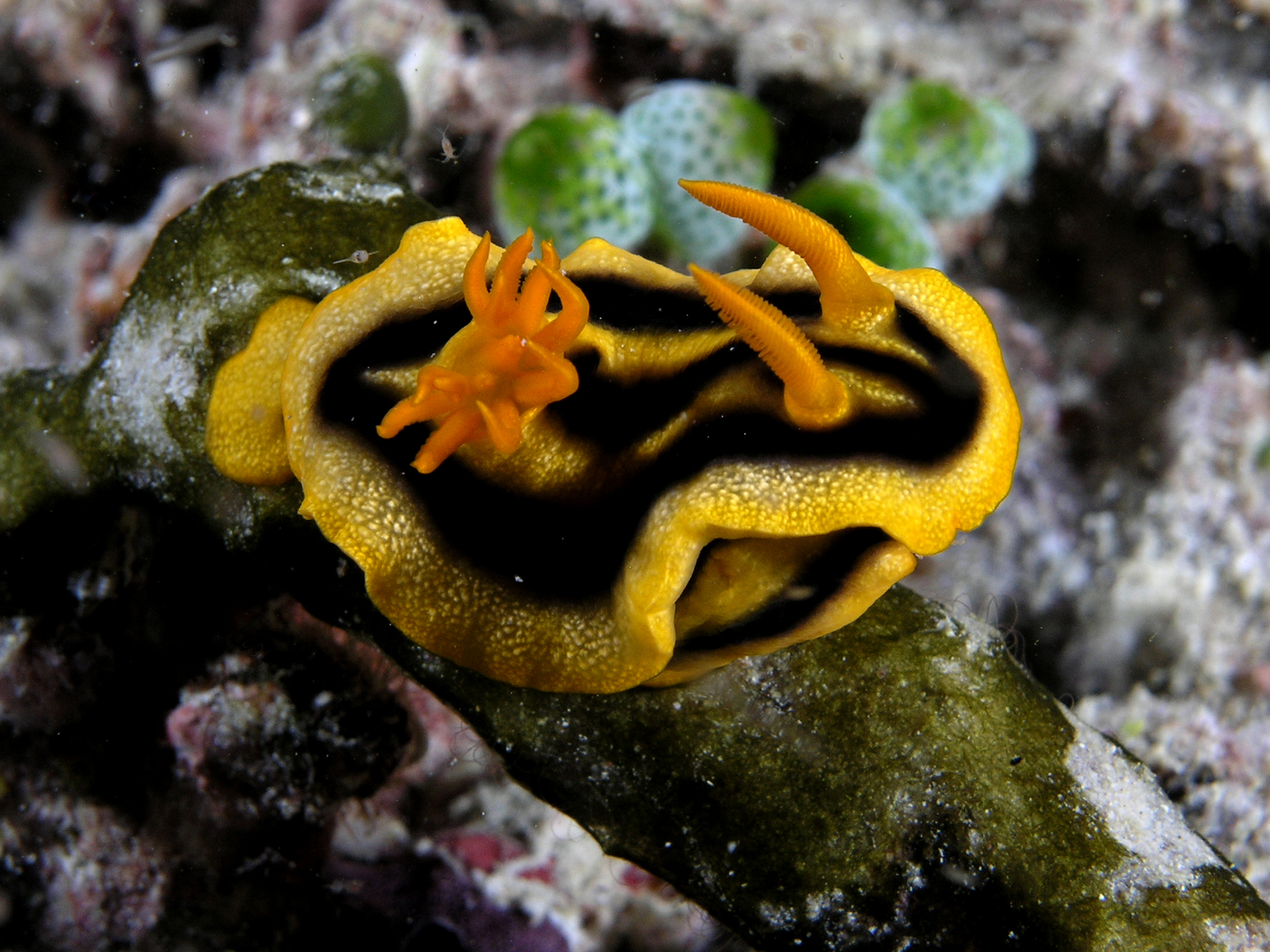
The dorid nudibranch Chromodoris joshi has a rosette of gills far back on the body. Nudibranch means "naked gills". Near the front of the animal are the two rhinophores.

In many gastropods, the filamentous gill has been replaced by a "plicate", or folded, structure. Many of these gastropods have also undergone detorsion, such that the mantle cavity and gill have shifted round to the right side of the body. This type of arrangement is found in the bubble shells and also in the sea hares, which also possess an exhalant siphon which sends fouled water away from the body.

In some nudibranchs, the mantle cavity and the original gill have disappeared altogether. Instead, the upper surface of the body has numerous club-shaped or branched projections called cerata that function as secondary gills. Secondary gills are also present in the unrelated genus Patella, in which they are found as folds within the mantle cavity.

Some smaller gastropods have neither true gills nor cerata. The genus Lepeta uses the whole of the mantle cavity as a respiratory surface, while many sea butterflies respire through their general body surface.

== Terrestrial gastropods ==
Although not true pulmonates, some operculate land snails, such as the Cyclophoridae have also lost their gills, and developed a vascularised lung from the mantle cavity. These groups lack a pneumostome, having a much larger opening to the cavity. Since this opening is usually closed by the operculum when the animal retreats into its shell, there is often a separate breathing tube or a notch in the shell to allow air in and out.

=== Terrestrial pulmonates ===
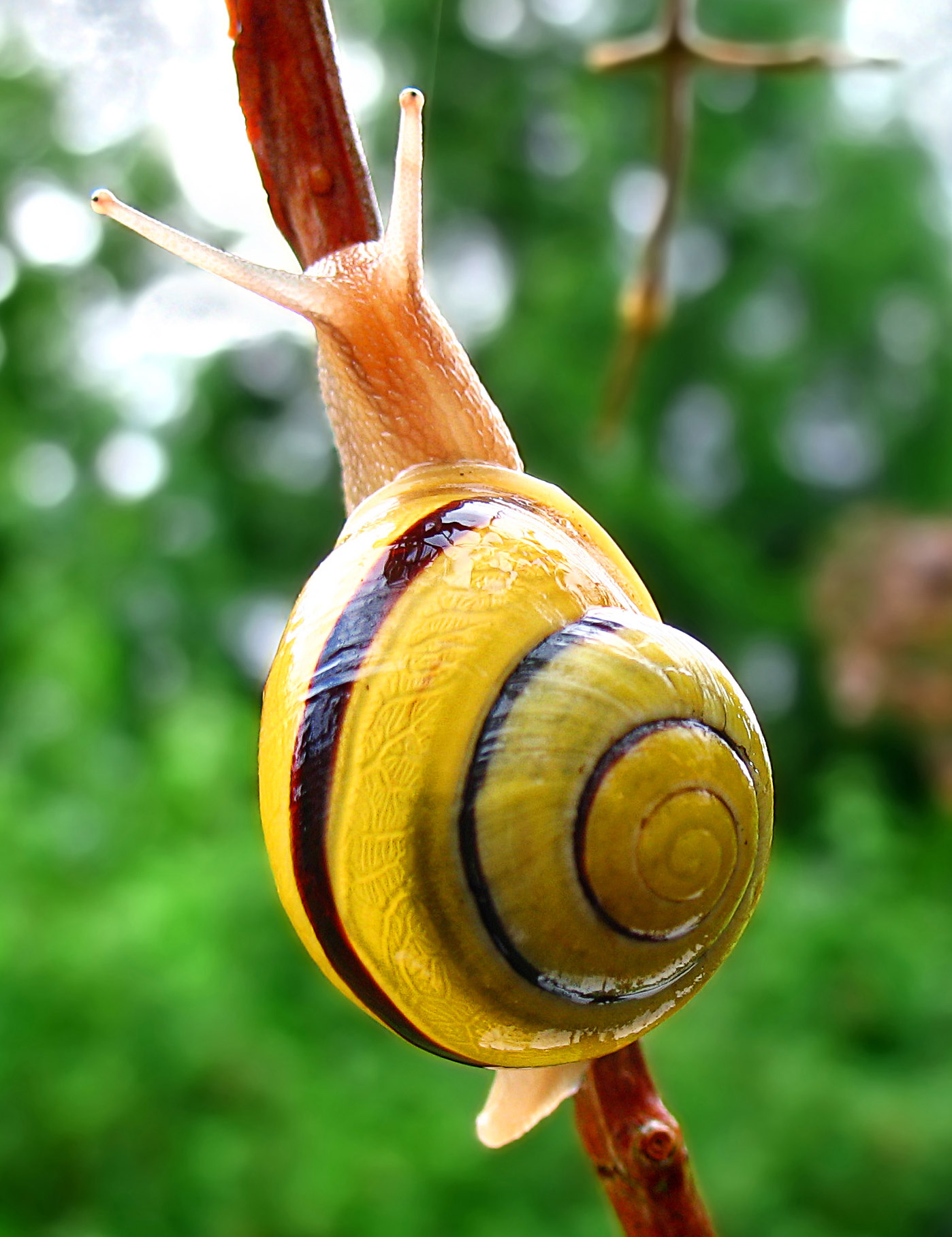
In this image of an individual of Cepaea nemoralis, a pulmonate land snail, the pallial lung is visible through the translucent shell as the brightest yellow part of the body whorl

The pulmonates have lost their gills and adapted the mantle cavity into a pallial lung. The lung has a single opening on the right side, called the pneumostome, which either remains permanently open, or opens and closes as the animal breathes. The roof of the lung is highly vascularised, and it is through this surface that gas exchange occurs.

The majority of pulmonates are fully terrestrial. Most have the typical lung arrangement described above, but in the Athoracophoridae, the mantle cavity is replaced by a series of blind tubules, while the Veronicellidae respire through their skin, and have lost the lung altogether.

== Freshwater snails ==
For freshwater snails with gills see above.

=== Freshwater pulmonates ===
Despite the presence of a lung, many pulmonates spend much of their lives underwater. Some of these possess secondary gills within the mantle cavity, while others must regularly return to the surface to breathe air, keeping their pneumostome closed while they are submerged.

Some freshwater pulmonates keep a bubble of air inside the shell, which helps them to float.

Many of the very small freshwater limpets which live in cold water have lost the ability to breathe air, and instead flood their mantle cavity with water. Oxygen diffuses from the water to the snail's body directly.
