= List of medical symptoms =

Medical symptoms refer to the manifestations or indications of a disease or condition, perceived and complained about by the patient. Patients observe these symptoms and seek medical advice from healthcare professionals.

Because most people are not diagnostically trained or knowledgeable, they typically describe their symptoms in layman's terms, rather than using specific medical terminology. This list is not exhaustive.

== Symptoms by presentation ==
My ... hurts

- abdomen
- back
- chest
- ear
- head
- pelvis
- tooth
- rectum
- skin
- Extremities
  - leg
- Chronic pain

I feel:

- Chills
- Fever
- Paresthesia (numbness, tingling, electric tweaks)
- Light-headed
- Dizzy
  - Dizzy – about to black out
  - Dizzy – with the room spinning around me
- My mouth is dry
- Nauseated
- Sick
  - like I have the flu
  - like I have to vomit
- Short of breath
- Sleepy
- Sweaty
- Thirsty
- Tired
- Weak

I can't:

- Breathe normally
- Hear normally:
  - losing hearing
  - sounds are too loud
  - ringing or hissing in my ears
- Move one side – arm and/or leg
- Defecate normally
- Urinate normally
- Remember normally
- See properly:
  - Blindness
  - blurred vision
  - double vision
- Sleep normally
- Smell things normally
- Speak normally
- Excrete solid feces
- Stop scratching
- Stop sweating
- Swallow normally
- Taste properly
- Walk normally
- Write normally

== Medical signs and symptoms ==
Where available, ICD-10 codes are listed. When codes are available both as a sign/symptom (R code) and as an underlying condition, the code for the sign is used.

When there is no symptoms for a disease that a patient has, the patient is said to be asymptomatic.

- General
  - anorexia (R63.0)
    - weight loss (R63.4)
  - cachexia (R64)
  - chills and shivering
  - convulsions (R56)
  - deformity
  - discharge
  - dizziness / Vertigo (R42)
  - fatigue (R53)
    - malaise
    - asthenia
  - hypothermia (T68)
  - jaundice (P58, P59, R17)
  - muscle weakness (M62.8)
  - pyrexia (R50)
  - sweats
  - swelling
  - swollen or painful lymph node(s) (I88, L04, R59.1)
  - weight gain (R63.5)
- Cardiovascular
  - arrhythmia
  - bradycardia (R00.1)
  - chest pain (R07)
  - claudication
  - palpitations (R00.2)
  - tachycardia (R00.0)
- Ear, Nose and Throat
  - dry mouth (R68.2)
  - epistaxis (R04.0)
  - halitosis
  - hearing loss
  - nasal discharge
  - otalgia (H92.0)
  - otorrhea (H92.1)
  - sore throat
  - toothache
  - tinnitus (H93.1)
  - trismus
- Gastrointestinal
  - abdominal pain (R10)
  - bloating (R14)
  - belching (R14)
  - bleeding:
    - Hematemesis
    - blood in stool: melena (K92.1), hematochezia
  - constipation (K59.0)
  - diarrhea (A09, K58, K59.1)
  - dysphagia (R13)
  - dyspepsia (K30)
  - fecal incontinence
  - flatulence (R14)
  - heartburn
  - nausea (R11)
  - odynophagia
  - proctalgia fugax
  - pyrosis (R12)
  - Rectal tenesmus
  - steatorrhea
  - vomiting (R11)
- Integumentary
  - Hair:
    - alopecia
    - hirsutism
    - hypertrichosis
  - nail:
  - Skin:
    - abrasion
    - anasarca (R60.1)
    - bleeding into the skin
      - petechia
      - purpura
      - ecchymosis and bruising (Sx0 (x=0 through 9))
    - blister (T14.0)
    - edema (R60)
    - itching (L29)
    - Janeway lesions and Osler's node
    - laceration
    - rash (R21)
    - urticaria (L50)
- Neurological
  - abnormal posturing
  - acalculia
  - agnosia
  - alexia
  - amnesia
  - anomia
  - anosognosia
  - aphasia and apraxia
  - apraxia
  - ataxia
  - cataplexy (G47.4)
  - confusion
  - dysarthria
  - dysdiadochokinesia
  - dysgraphia
  - hallucination
  - headache (R51)
  - hypokinetic movement disorder:
    - akinesia
    - bradykinesia
  - hyperkinetic movement disorder:
    - akathisia
    - athetosis
    - ballismus
    - blepharospasm
    - chorea
    - dystonia
    - fasciculation
    - muscle cramps (R25.2)
    - myoclonus
    - opsoclonus
    - tic
    - tremor
      - flapping tremor
  - insomnia (F51.0, G47.0)
  - Lhermitte's sign (as if an electrical sensation shoots down back & into arms)
  - loss of consciousness
    - Syncope (medicine) (R55)
  - neck stiffness
  - opisthotonus
  - paralysis and paresis
  - paresthesia (R20.2)
  - prosopagnosia
  - somnolence (R40.0)
- Obstetric / Gynaecological
  - abnormal vaginal bleeding
    - vaginal bleeding in early pregnancy / miscarriage
    - vaginal bleeding in late pregnancy
  - amenorrhea
  - infertility
  - painful intercourse (N94.1)
  - pelvic pain
  - vaginal discharge
- Ocular
  - amaurosis fugax (G45.3) and amaurosis
  - blurred vision
  - Dalrymple's sign
  - double vision (H53.2)
  - exophthalmos (H05.2)
  - mydriasis/miosis (H570)
  - nystagmus
- Psychiatric
  - amusia
  - anhedonia
  - anxiety
  - apathy
  - confabulation
  - depression
  - delusion
  - euphoria
  - homicidal ideation
  - irritability
  - mania (F30)
  - paranoid ideation
  - phobia:
  - suicidal ideation
- Pulmonary
  - apnea and hypopnea
  - cough (R05)
  - dyspnea (R06.0)
    - bradypnea (R06.0) and tachypnea (R06.0)
    - orthopnea and platypnea
    - trepopnea
  - hemoptysis (R04.2)
  - pleuritic chest pain
  - sputum production (R09.3)
- Rheumatologic
  - arthralgia
  - back pain
  - sciatica
- Urologic
  - dysuria (R30.0)
  - hematospermia
  - hematuria (R31)
  - impotence (N48.4)
  - polyuria (R35)
  - retrograde ejaculation
  - strangury
  - urethral discharge
  - urinary frequency (R35)
  - urinary incontinence (R32)
  - urinary retention

== See also ==
- List of ICD-9 codes 780-799: Symptoms, signs, and ill-defined conditions
