= Cardiac asthma =

- Specialty: Cardiology
- Symptoms: Wheezing, Coughing, shortness of breath
- Duration: Acute or chronic
- Causes: Congestive heart failure
- Diagnostic method: Cardiac workup, lung function testing, imaging
- Differential diagnosis: Bronchial asthma
- Treatment: Improving cardiac function, maintaining blood oxygen saturation levels, stabilizing total body water volume and distribution

Cardiac asthma is the medical condition of intermittent wheezing, coughing, and shortness of breath that is associated with underlying congestive heart failure (CHF). Symptoms of cardiac asthma are related to the heart's inability to effectively and efficiently pump blood in a CHF patient. This can lead to accumulation of fluid in and around the lungs (pulmonary congestion), disrupting the lung's ability to oxygenate blood.

Cardiac asthma carries similar symptoms to bronchial asthma, but is differentiated by lacking inflammatory origin. Because of the similarity in symptoms, diagnosis of cardiac versus bronchial asthma relies on full cardiac workup and pulmonary function testing.

Treatment is centered on improving cardiac function, maintaining blood oxygen saturation levels, and stabilizing total body water volume and distribution.

== Signs and symptoms ==
The most common findings of cardiac asthma are the presence of wheeze, cough, or shortness of breath (predominantly occurring at night or when lying down) in a patient that possesses signs of congestive heart failure.

Additional findings consist of production of frothy or watery sputum and presence of water in the lungs that can be heard via stethoscope. In severe cases, a patient can experience multiple night time episodes of breathlessness, changes in skin coloration, and episodes of bloody sputum.

== Pathophysiology ==
The underlying causes for cardiac asthma stem from the eventual back up of fluid into the pulmonary vasculature as a result of the heart's, particularly left sided, inability to effectively and efficiently pump blood. The accumulation of fluid in the heart creates a higher than normal pressure system that places increasing pressure demands on the pulmonary venous system in order for appropriate oxygenation of blood to occur. This results in what is called pulmonary venous hypertension (PVH), and results in distention and recruitment of pulmonary capillaries to help distribute the increased pressure gradient. At the capillary, there is a microvascular barrier that helps regulate fluid status via molecular pressure forces such as forces that push outward from vessels and pressures that pull or attract into vessels. With increasing PVH, pressure outward overcomes pressure inward, and fluid is distributed to the lung interstitium, preserving oxygen exchange at the capillary. Fluid is transported to the hilum and pleural space, and removed via the lymphatic system. At first, the body is capable of handling excess water. Later, the capillary vasculature is overwhelmed by increased pressure and fluid backs up into the alveolar sac, resulting in pulmonary edema and decreased oxygenation capability. Additionally, increased pressure demands on capillary vasculature result in increases in vascular tone to include remodeling of pre-capillary vessels such as medial wall hypertrophic changes. Over time, the remodeling efforts of the vessels can progress to hyperplastic changes of the vessels' wall construction, and results in increased pulmonary vascular resistance.

There is ongoing interest into establishing connections of cardiac asthma to abnormalities in bronchiole anatomy. Current evaluation has proposed multiple mechanisms for increased airway resistance, and focus is on four alternate explanations:

- Bronchoconstriction as a result of pulmonary edema.
- Intrathoracic space competition from heart enlargement and pulmonary edema (complications of CHF) that compress airway construction and bronchioles.
- Bronchial obstruction secondary to intraluminal edema.
- Bronchial mucosa edema.

== Diagnosis ==
The diagnosis of cardiac asthma is accomplished through workup of congestive heart failure, complete with:

- Evaluation of current symptoms with specific consideration of chronological progression or worsening.
- Past medical History screen with consideration for conditions that predispose to heart failure, such as prior heart attack, history of coronary revascularization, high blood pressure, or diabetes (heart).
- Physical exam with emphasis on listening for abnormalities of heart sound, abnormalities of lung sound, or presence of increased fluid retention in neck or in extremities.
- Laboratory evaluation with specific interest in B-type natriuretic peptide levels.
- Electrocardiography to evaluate for irregularities in heart rhythm.
- Chest Radiograph to evaluate for presence of lung congestion or increased heart size.
- Echocardiography to evaluate heart function. Echocardiography is the preferred choice for diagnosis of heart failure in patients.

As well as evaluation of lung function via:

- Pulmonary function testing (PFT) complete with bronchoprovocation testing. PFTs represent the preferred method for evaluating for bronchial asthma.

== Management ==
Treatment of asthma symptoms in CHF patients is directed towards optimizing the patient's cardiovascular status and correcting potential oxygen deficit. Current recommendations in acute asthma symptoms are utilization of diuretics such as furosemide, venodilators such as nitroglycerin, and morphine. The initial strategy should focus on decreasing patient fluid retention with diuretic therapy, thereby decreasing cardiac preload and overall fluid load in pulmonary circuit (pulmonary congestion). Next, if aggressive diuresis is not adequately correcting symptoms, venodilators can be used to distribute blood and fluid to the venous system, thereby decreasing cardiac preload and left heart pressures contributing to pulmonary congestion. Lastly, morphine can be utilized for assistance in improving ease of breathing through a presumed mechanism similar to venodilation, as well as reducing patient anxiety. Additionally, applications of supplemental oxygen and repositioning to upright or standing positions in events of low blood oxygen saturation and difficulty breathing can be utilized as needed.

Chronic management of cardiac asthma is directed at optimizing therapy of heart failure. Current recommendations can be found at its respective page (congestive heart failure).

There is importance of distinguishing whether asthma is of bronchial or cardiac origin because management of bronchial asthma is primarily centered on utilization of inhalers, such as bronchodilators and corticosteroids. At this point in time, there has been limited evidence of improvement of cardiac asthma symptoms with utilization of inhalers.

== See also ==
- Dyspnea
- Trepopnea
