= List of terms of lung size and activity =

Following are terms that specify a type of lung size and/or activity. More specific definitions may be found in individual articles.

- Eupnea – normal breathing
- Apnea – absence of breathing
- Bradypnea – decreased breathing rate
- Dyspnea or shortness of breath – sensation of respiratory distress
- Hyperaeration/Hyperinflation – increased lung volume
- Hyperpnea – fast and deep breathing
- Hyperventilation – increased breathing that causes CO_{2} loss
- Hypopnea – slow and shallow breathing
- Hypoventilation – decreased breathing that causes CO_{2} gain
- Labored breathing – physical presentation of respiratory distress
- Tachypnea – increased breathing rate
- Orthopnea – Breathlessness in lying down position relieved by sitting up or standing
- Platypnea – Breathlessness when seated or standing, relieved by lying flat
- Trepopnea – Breathlessness when lying flat relieved by lying in a lateral position
- Ponopnea – Painful breathing

== See also ==
- Control of respiration
