= Juxtacapillary receptors =

Juxtacapillary receptors, J-receptors, or pulmonary C-fiber receptors are sensory nerve endings located within the alveolar walls in juxtaposition to the pulmonary capillaries of the lung and are innervated by fibers of the vagus nerve. These receptors were discovered by Autar Paintal.

Although their functional role is unclear, J-receptors respond to events such as pulmonary edema, pulmonary emboli, pneumonia, congestive heart failure and barotrauma, which cause a decrease in oxygenation and thus lead to an increase in respiration. They may be also stimulated by hyperinflation of the lung as well as intravenous or intracardiac administration of chemicals such as capsaicin. The stimulation of the J-receptors causes a reflex increase in breathing rate, and is also thought to be involved in the sensation of dyspnea, the subjective sensation of difficulty breathing. The reflex response that is produced is apnea followed by rapid breathing, bradycardia, and hypotension (pulmonary chemoreflex). The physiologic role of this reflex is uncertain, but it probably occurs in pathologic states such as pulmonary congestion or embolization.

Because these receptors have been found in the walls of bronchi, the larynx, and the nose, they appear to be part of a widespread population of nociceptors found in most tissue. For this reason, they are now usually referred to as pulmonary C-fiber receptors.
