= Churchill–Cope reflex =

Cardiovascular reflex

The Churchill–Cope reflex is a reflex in which distension of the pulmonary vascular bed, as occurs in pulmonary edema, causes an increase in respiratory rate (tachypnoea) by stimulation of the juxtacapillary (J) receptors.

It was described in 1929 by Edward Delos Churchill and Oliver Cope.
