= ESI =

ESI or Esi may refer to:

== Science and technology ==
- Earth Similarity Index
- Electrospray ionization, a technique used in mass spectrometry
- Environmental Seismic Intensity scale
- Essential Science Indicators, by Clarivate
- Electronic supplementary information, in scientific publications; for example see coordination polymerization

=== Computing ===
- Edge Side Includes, a markup language
- Electronically stored information (Federal Rules of Civil Procedure)
- Enterprise Southbridge Interface, a motherboard interface
- ESI register, in the x86 microprocessor architecture

=== Medicine ===
- Electromagnetic source imaging
- Emergency Severity Index, a triage algorithm
- Epidural steroid injection

== Organisations ==
- Electro Scientific Industries, an American high-technology company
- Employees' State Insurance, in India
  - ESI Hospital metro station, Delhi
  - ESI Hospital metro station (Hyderabad)
- Ernst Strüngmann Institute, a German research institute
- Erwin Schrödinger International Institute for Mathematical Physics, in Austria
- Escadron spécial d'intervention, now the Belgian Federal Police Special Units
- European Stability Initiative, a think tank
- ITT Educational Services, owner of the defunct ITT Technical Institute

== People ==
- Esi Awuah, Ghanaian academic
- Esi Benyarku (born 1976), Canadian sprinter
- Esi Buobasa, Ghanaian activist
- Esi Edugyan (born 1978), Canadian novelist
- Esi Lufo (born 2001), Albanian footballer
- Esi Sutherland-Addy, Ghanaian academic
- Esikeli Tonga (born 1988), Australian rugby league player

== Other uses ==
- Enhanced Station Initiative, of the New York City Subway
- Enlightened self-interest, a philosophy in ethics
- Environmental Sustainability Index
- Ethical Sensory Introvert, in socionics
- Export substitution industrialization
- Early supplier involvement, an aspect of supplier integration in new product development
- North Alaskan Inupiatun language (ISO 639-3 code)
