= Labored breathing =

Respiration needing increased effort

Labored respiration, labored breathing or gasping is an abnormal respiration characterized by evidence of increased work of breathing, including the use of accessory muscles of respiration, stridor, grunting, or nasal flaring.

== Classification ==
Labored breathing is distinguished from shortness of breath or dyspnea, which is the sensation of respiratory distress rather than a physical presentation.

Still, many simply define dyspnea as difficulty in breathing without further specification, which may confuse it with e.g. labored breathing or tachypnea (rapid breathing). Labored breathing has occasionally been included in the definition of dyspnea as well. However, in the standard definition, these related signs may be present at the same time, but do not necessarily have to be. For instance, in respiratory arrest by a primary failure in respiratory muscles the patient, if conscious, may experience dyspnea, yet without having any labored breathing or tachypnea. The other way around, labored breathing or tachypnea can voluntarily be performed even when there is no dyspnea.

== Presentations ==
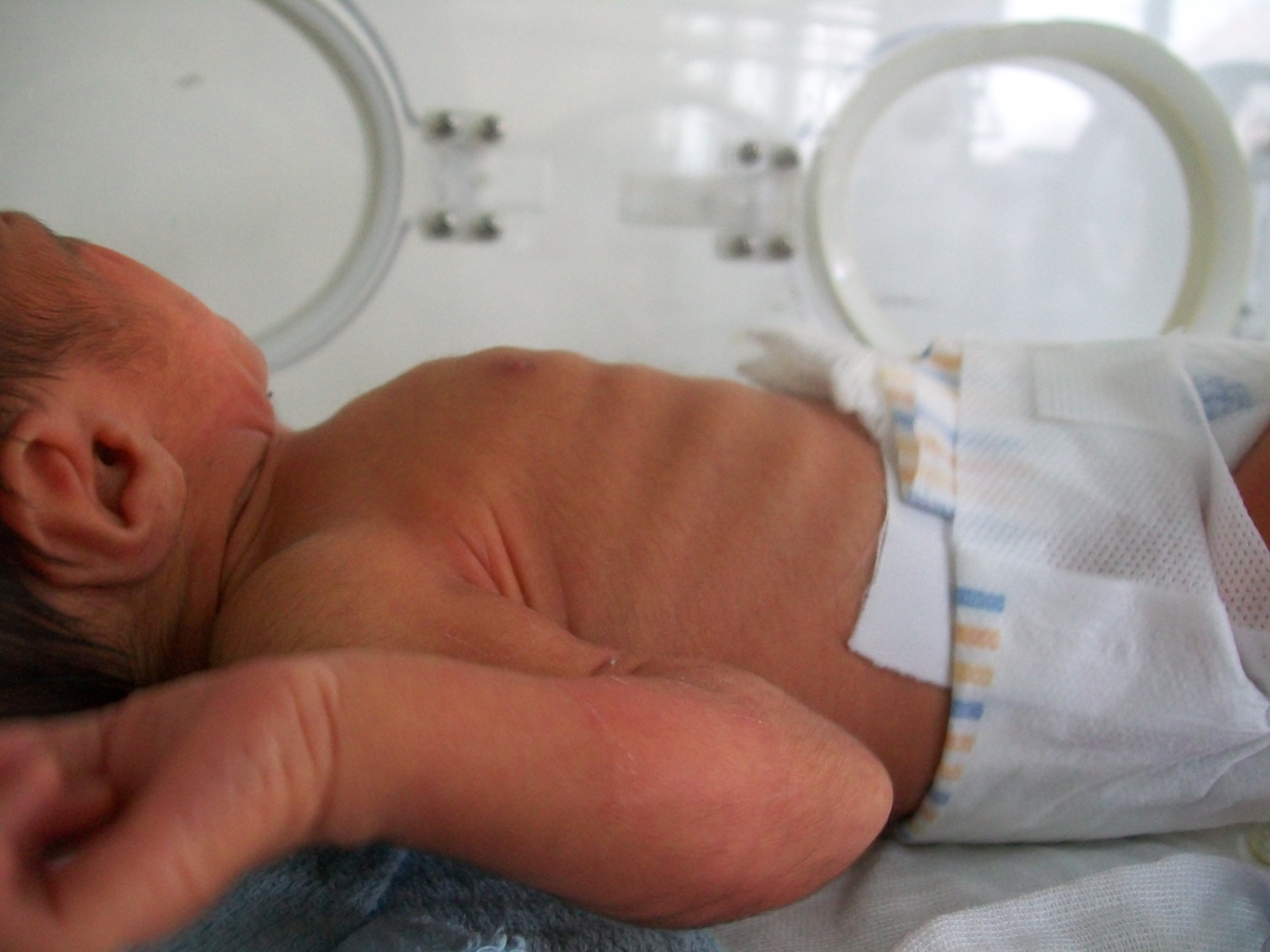
Intercostal recessions on a newborn baby, a common sign of respiratory distress.

Presentations of labored respiration include:

- Hyperpnea - faster and/or deeper breathing
- Tachypnea - increased breathing rate
- Retractions or recessions – sucking in of the skin, around the ribs and the top of the sternum
- Use of accessory muscles of respiration rather than only the diaphragm

== Causes ==
Causes of labored breathing include:

- Severe metabolic acidosis, particularly diabetic ketoacidosis (DKA) but also kidney failure. The specific associated breathing pattern is called Kussmaul breathing.
- Cardiac disease
- Respiratory failure

== See also ==
- List of terms of lung size and activity
- Agonal respiration, a specific type of abnormal breathing pattern
