= Eupnea =

Natural, comfortable form of breathing in mammals

In the mammalian respiratory system, eupnea is normal, good, healthy and unlabored breathing, sometimes known as quiet breathing or a resting respiratory rate. In eupnea, expiration employs only the elastic recoil of the lungs.

Eupnea is the unaffected natural breathing in all mammals, including humans. Eupnea does not require any volitional effort whatsoever, but occurs whenever a mammal is in a natural state of relaxation, i.e. when there is no clear and present danger in their environment and without substantial exertion. When a mammal perceives potential danger or is under exertion, eupnea stops, and a much more limited and labored form of breathing—shallow breathing—occurs.

Eupnea is an efficient and effective form of breathing, which balances between maximizing air intake, and minimizing muscular effort.

During eupnea, neural output to respiratory muscles is highly regular and stable, with rhythmic bursts of activity during inspiration only to the diaphragm and external intercostal muscles.

== Etymology and pronunciation ==
The word eupnea uses combining forms of eu- + -pnea, from Greek eupnoia, from eu-, "well" + pnoia, "breath". See pronunciation information at dyspnea.

== See also ==
- List of terms of lung size and activity
- Respiratory rate
- Dyspnea
- Tachypnea
- Bradypnea
- Apnea
