= Platypnea-orthodeoxia syndrome =

Shortness of breath and low oxygen saturation only while upright

- Specialty: Cardiology, cardiothoracic surgery (primarily), pulmonology (secondarily), neurology, hepatology and general surgery
- Differential diagnosis: Intracardiac shunting

Platypnea–orthodeoxia syndrome is a rare medical condition in which a person has shortness of breath and low oxygen saturations when upright (platypnea and orthodeoxia), but no symptoms when lying down. It can be caused by ventilation-perfusion mismatch, intracardiac shunting, or pulmonary shunting. In some cases, the cause is multifactorial and it is usually caused by a different underlying disease.

Although the mechanism is still unclear, it is thought to be caused by right to left shunting of blood flow due to an anatomic defect allowing communication between right and left-sided circulation, such as an atrial septal defect, patent foramen ovale, or pulmonary atrioventricular malformations, and a functional component that causes blood to move through the shunt, such as Ebstein's Anomaly, pulmonary hypertension, or absent superior vena cava. Transesophageal echocardiography can confirm posture-dependent right-to-left shunting and is an important diagnostic tool when platypnea–orthodeoxia syndrome is suspected.
