= Tripod position =

Position of a patient who suffers from orthopnea

The tripod position is often seen in epiglottitis

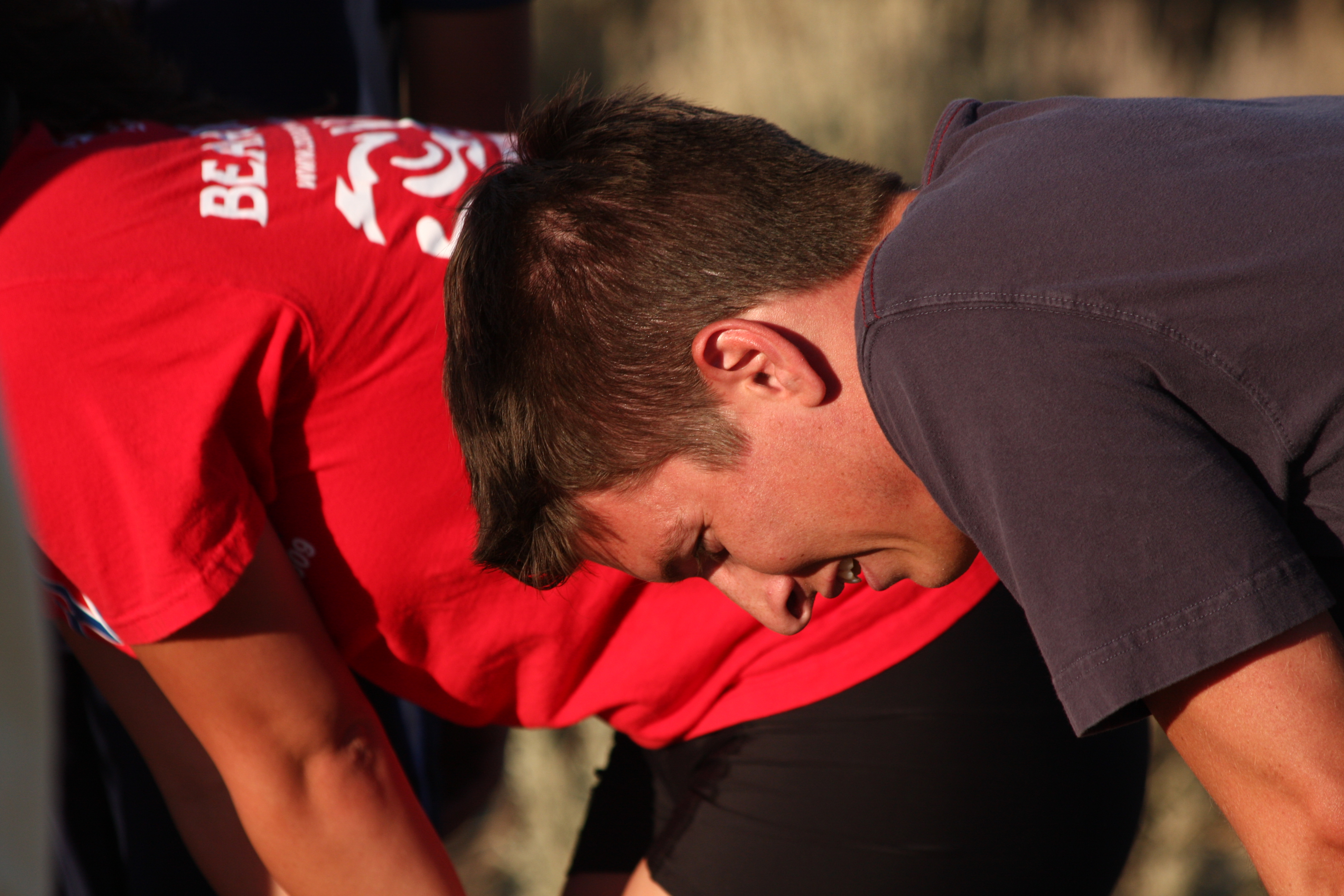
The tripod position may be adopted by people experiencing respiratory distress or who are simply out of breath.

The tripod position or orthopneic position is a physical stance often assumed by people experiencing respiratory distress (such as chronic obstructive pulmonary disease) or who are simply out of breath (such as a person who has just run a sprint). In tripod position, one sits or stands leaning forward and supporting the upper body with hands on the knees or on another surface.

Among medical professionals, a patient adopting the tripod position is considered an indication that the patient may be in respiratory distress.

The tripod position can help to decrease breathlessness by stabilizing and lifting the shoulder girdle. This may allow better use of accessory muscles in the neck and upper chest and elsewhere, and help to restore a normal dome-shaped position of the diaphragm. With the position of the arms secure, contraction of the pectoralis results in elevation of the anterior wall of the chest. This may give subjective relief for those experiencing breathlessness. It may not increase air flow into the lungs.

Patients who are suffering from breathing difficulties may be placed in this position by nurses; the patient sits at the side of the bed with head resting on an over-bed table on top of several pillows.

== See also ==
- Bendopnea
