= Bendopnea =

Shortness of breath while leaning forward

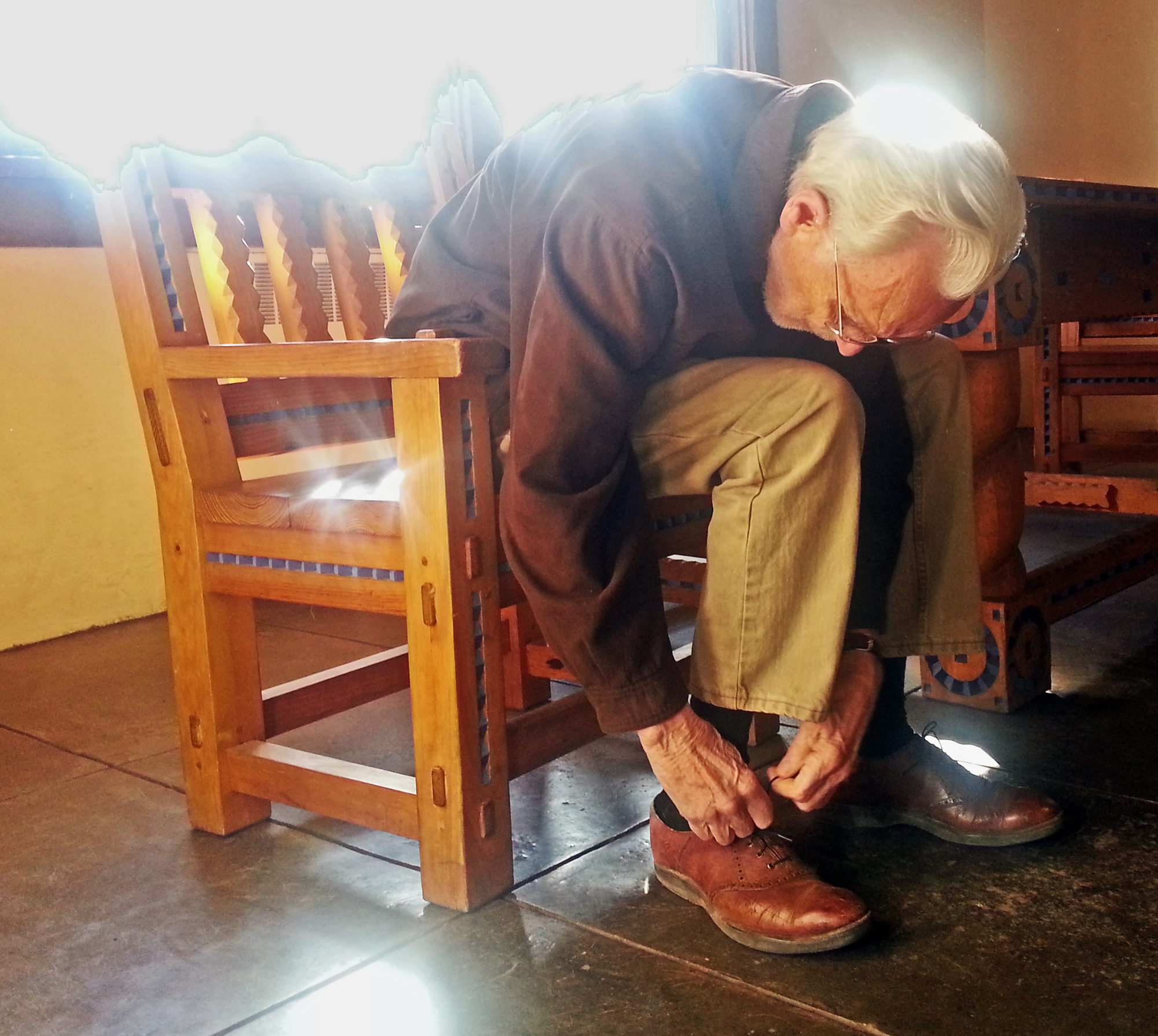
- Bendopnea can occur in patients with heart failure when they bend over, such as when tying their shoes.
- Differential diagnosis: heart failure

Bendopnea is a newly described symptom, normally of heart failure, meaning shortness of breath felt when leaning forward. It was introduced by Thibodeau et al. in 2014. Patients with heart failure often experience this when bending over to tie a shoe, putting socks on, or other activities requiring bending downwards. It has been defined as occurring within 30 seconds of bending over, but could occur in as few as 8 seconds in severe cases. When a patient is in heart failure, it often means the ventricular filling pressures are high at baseline. When said person bends forward, it causes a further increase in ventricular filling pressures that causes dyspnea, especially in patients with lower cardiac indices.

The term "bendopnea" (meaning "bent" and "breath") was coined to be easily identifiable among patients and physicians.

Bendopnea should be distinguished from orthopnea (shortness of breath while lying down), trepopnea (shortness of breath while lying on one side), and platypnea (shortness of breath relieved by lying down and worsened when upright) with or without orthodeoxia (oxygen desaturation).

== See also ==
- Tripod position
