= Emergency Severity Index =

Hospital emergency triage process

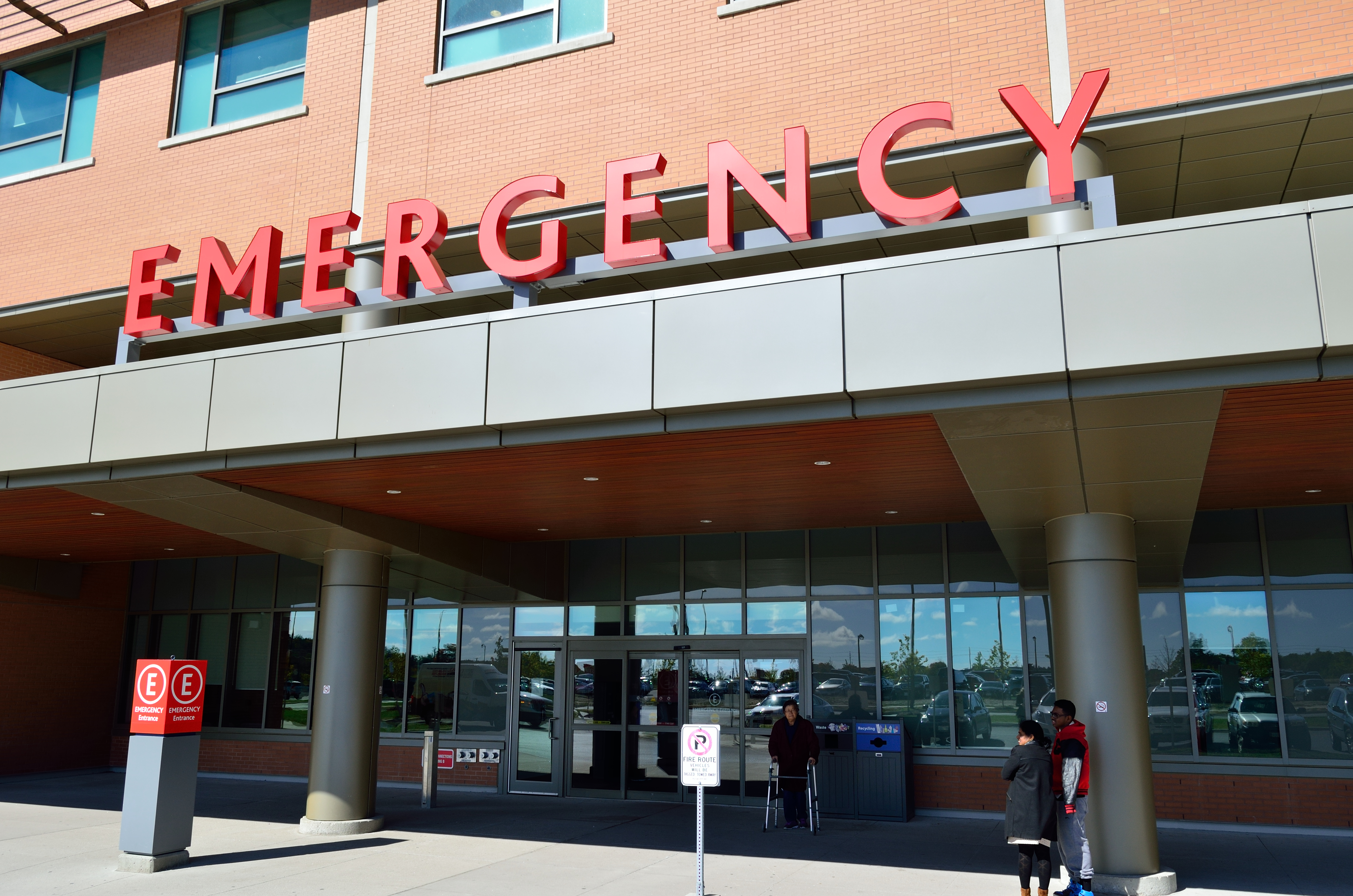
Emergency Dept. Entrance

The Emergency Severity Index (ESI) is a five-level emergency department triage algorithm, initially developed in 1998 by emergency physicians Richard Wurez and David Eitel, along with emergency nurses Nicki Gilboy, Taula Tanabe, and Debbie Travers. It was previously maintained by the Agency for Healthcare Research and Quality (AHRQ) but is currently maintained by the Emergency Nurses Association (ENA). Five-level acuity scales continue to remain pertinent due to their effectiveness of identifying patients in need of emergent treatment and categorizing patients in limited resource situations.

== Algorithm ==
ESI triage is based on the acuity (severity) of patients' medical conditions in acute care settings and the number of resources their care is anticipated to require. This algorithm is practiced by paramedics and registered nurses primarily in hospitals. The ESI algorithm differs from other standardized triage algorithms used in countries besides the United States, such as the Australasian Triage Scale (ATS) or the Canadian Triage and Acuity Scale (CTAS), which both focus more on presenting symptoms and diagnoses to determine how long a patient can safely wait for care. According to the Fast Facts for the Triage Nurse handbook, the ESI algorithm is primarily used in the United States. As of 2019, 94% of United States EDs use the ESI algorithm in triage.

The concept of a "resource" in ESI means types of interventions or diagnostic tools, above and beyond physical examination. Examples of resources include radiologic imaging, lab work, sutures, and intravenous or intramuscular medications. Oral medications, simple wound care, crutches/splints, and prescriptions are specifically not considered resources by the ESI algorithm.

The ESI levels are numbered one through five, with levels one and two indicating the greatest urgency based on patient acuity. However, levels 3, 4, and 5 are determined not by urgency, but by the number of resources expected to be used as determined by a licensed healthcare professional (medic/nurse) trained in triage processes. The levels are as follows:

| Level | Description | Examples |
|---|---|---|
| 1 | Immediate, life-saving intervention required without delay | Cardiac arrest Unresponsive Profound hypotension or hypoglycemia |
| 2 | High risk of deterioration, or signs of a time-critical problem | Cardiac-related chest pain Asthma attack Altered mental status |
| 3 | Stable, with multiple types of resources needed to investigate or treat (such as lab tests plus diagnostic imaging) | Abdominal pain High fever with cough Persistent headache |
| 4 | Stable, with only one type of resource anticipated (such as only an x-ray, or only sutures) | Simple laceration Rabies vaccination Sore throat |
| 5 | Stable, with no resources anticipated except oral or topical medications, or prescriptions | Suture removal Prescription refill Foreign body in eye |

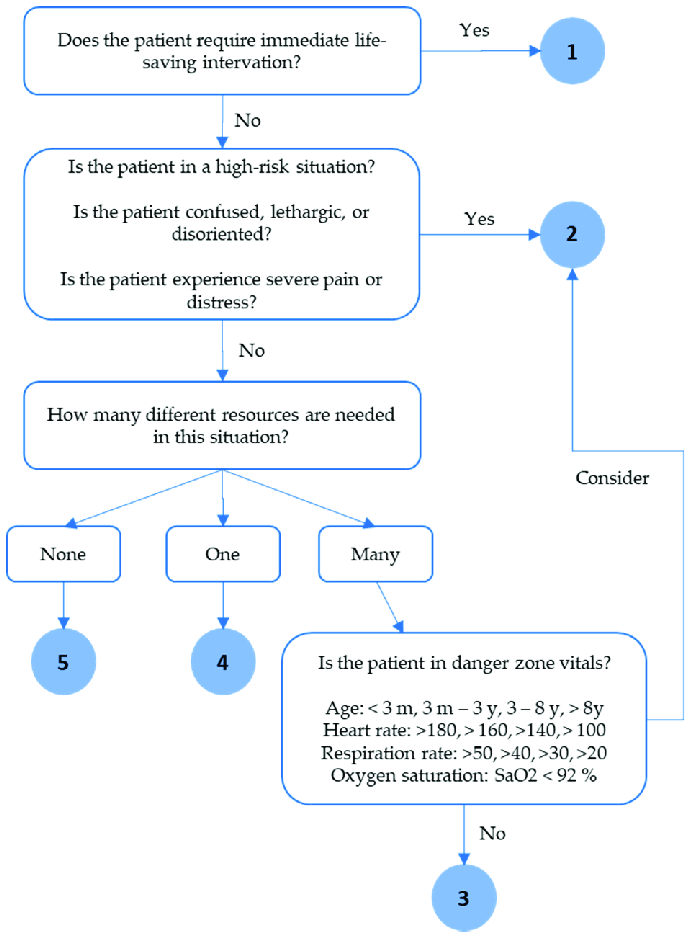
ESI triage algorithm, Gilboy et al.

The ESI algorithm includes multiple "decision points" labeled A, B, C, and D.

== Clinical relevance ==
Triage acuity rating scales were not standardized until approximately 2010 when the ENA and American College of Emergency Physicians (ACEP) released a revised statement stating that they support the adoption of a valid five-level triage scale such as the ESI for emergency departments to benefit the quality of patient care. Pediatric patients require special consideration. The ESI should be used in conjunction with the PAT (pediatric assessment triangle) and an obtained focused pediatric history to assign an acuity level.

Extensive research has been done on the efficacy and applicability of the ESI compared to multiple other triage algorithms and scales, including the Taiwan Triage System (TTS). The ESI has been found to be reliable, consistent, and accurate in multiple studies, languages, age groups, and countries.

== Application ==
The ESI algorithm should not be used in certain mass casualty or trauma related incidents. Instead, START (Simple Triage and Rapid Treatment)/JumpSTART for pediatric patients or similar valid rapid triage programs should be used instead. The use of the ESI algorithm should strictly be used by those with at least one year ED experience that have taken a comprehensive triage program.

== Sources ==
- Gilboy N, Tanabe T, Travers D, Rosenau AM (2011). Emergency Severity Index (ESI): A Triage Tool for Emergency Department Care, Version 4. Implementation Handbook 2012 Edition. AHRQ. ISBN 978-1-58763-416-1. Archived from the original on 2013-06-11.
- Gilboy N, Tanabe T, Travers D, Rosenau AM (2020). Emergency Severity Index (ESI): A Triage Tool for Emergency Department Care, Version 4. 2020 Edition (PDF). Emergency Nurses Association.
