= Negative-pressure pulmonary edema =

Lung disorder

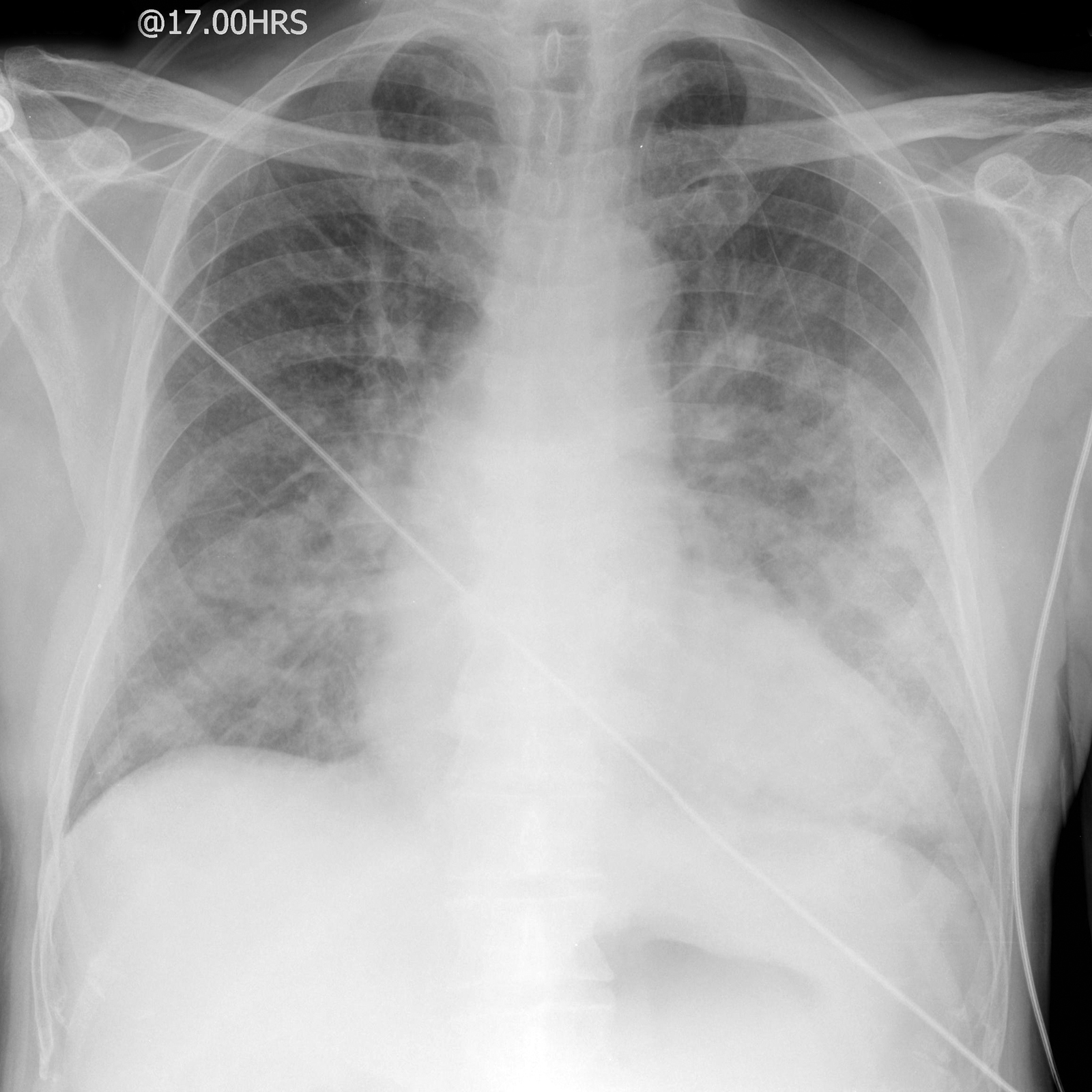
AP portable CXR of a patient in acute pulmonary edema.

Negative-pressure pulmonary edema (NPPE), also known as postobstructive pulmonary edema, is a clinical phenomenon that results from the generation of large negative pressures in the airways during attempted inspiration against some form of obstruction of the upper airways. The most common reported cause of NPPE reported in adults is laryngospasm, while the most implicated causes in children are infectious croup and epiglottitis. The large negative pressures created in the airways by inhalation against an upper airway obstruction can lead to fluid being drawn from blood vessels supplying the lungs into the alveoli, causing pulmonary edema and impaired ability for oxygen exchange (hypoxemia). The main treatment for NPPE is supportive care in an intensive care unit and can be fatal without intervention.

== Physiology ==
NPPE develops as a result of significant negative pressure generated in the chest cavity by inspiration against an upper airway obstruction. These negative pressures in the chest lead to increase venous supply to the right side of the heart (preload) while simultaneously creating more resistance for the left side of the heart to supply blood to the rest of the body (afterload). This large negative force also results in a decrease of the forces exerted by fluids outside of the pulmonary blood vessels. This results in an increased amount of fluid shifting from these vessels into the lower pressure extravascular space. While there normally is a net passage of fluid out of the vasculature at baseline, this is a small enough amount to be drained from the extravascular space by the lymphatic system, and as such fluid does not accumulate. In the setting of NPPE, the excess shift of fluid overcome the ability of the lymphatic system, and fluid (edema) accumulates in the alveoli of the lungs. As these structures are important for gas exchange during respiration, patients with NPPE struggle to have adequate oxygen supply to the tissues of their body.

== Causes ==
There are a variety of causes of NPPE, which can theoretically result from any upper airway obstruction. In adults, the most frequent cause is laryngospasm (involuntary contraction of the vocal cords) after extubation, making up approximately 50% of all adults cases of NPPE. The incidence of NPPE as a result of postextubation laryngospasm has been estimated to be between 0.1-3.0%. In the pediatric setting, the reported most common causes of NPPE are both infectious in nature: croup and epiglottitis. Other reported causes include endotracheal tube obstruction (e.g., from patient biting down on tube), tumors/masses compressing the upper airway, choking on foreign objects, strangulation. Interestingly, the use of sugammadex to reverse neuromuscular blockade (the mechanism of paralysis during surgery) has also been associated with increased incidence of NPPE

Risk factors associated with development of NPPE include male sex, younger age, increased cardiovascular fitness, and undergoing head or neck surgery.

== Signs and symptoms ==
See signs and symptoms of pulmonary edema

== Diagnosis ==
Diagnosis of NPPE is essentially a diagnosis of exclusion. When a patient presents with acute pulmonary edema in the perioperative setting, cardiac causes should first be excluded. This can be done with electrocardiogram, echocardiogram, measurement of cardiac enzymes, etc. Other causes of pulmonary edema that require rapid intervention and should be considered first include fluid overload, brain injury, and anaphylaxis. If when considering these differentials, there is no evidence for administration of excessive fluids, no focal signs suggesting a brain injury, and so signs of allergic reaction, one can then consider NPPE. Clinical signs supportive of upper airway obstruction such as stridor and/or wheezing in the setting of pulmonary edema point to the diagnosis of NPPE.

== Treatment ==
NPPE is potentially fatal, and prompt recognition is important to prevent adverse outcome. The first principle of treatment is to relieve the airway obstruction. Most commonly, this is done through endotracheal intubation. This ensures appropriate airway support and allows for easy supply of supplemental oxygen. Positive pressures oxygenation is used to reverse the negative pressures in the chest resulting from the obstruction. In cases where endotracheal intubation is difficult or cannot be done, creation of a surgical airway may be necessary in order provide positive-pressure ventilation. If the cause of the obstruction is simply biting of the endotracheal tube, treatment can simply be administration of low dose succinylcholine in order prevent contraction of the jaw.

Once the cause of obstruction and the resultant negative pressures are addresses, the rest of the management is the same as the standard care to relieve pulmonary edema.
