= Oliver Cope =

American surgeon

Oliver Cope (1902 - 30 April 1994), was an American surgeon known for his work in parathyroid surgery, burns treatment and breast cancer treatment. He is also remembered for describing the Churchill-Cope reflex.

== Biography ==
Oliver Cope was born in 1902 in Germantown, Pennsylvania. He went to Haverford College in 1919, transferred to Harvard University the following year, and graduated in 1923. He then attended Harvard Medical School, graduating M.D. in 1928. His surgical training was carried out at Massachusetts General Hospital, where he became an assistant to Edward Delos Churchill. During this time he and Churchill published the findings of research which described the Churchill-Cope reflex. He married Alice DeNormandie in 1932, and was awarded a Moseley Travelling Fellowship after completing his surgical residency. The couple travelled to Europe, starting in Berlin where they witnessed Nazi persecution of Jewish academics. They left Germany and moved to London, where Cope studied under Sir Henry Dale at the National Institute of Medicine. During their time in London they developed a friendship with Harold Himsworth of University College Hospital; during the Second World War Himsworth's children stayed with the Cope family in Cambridge, Massachusetts.

=== Parathyroid surgery ===
Cope returned to Massachusetts General Hospital in 1934, also joining the faculty of Harvard Medical School. At that time, Edward Churchill and others such as Fuller Albright were starting to perform surgery for the treatment of hyperparathyroidism. Before carrying out surgery, Churchill asked Cope to perform dissections to study the parathyroid glands, to increase knowledge of the normal and abnormal anatomy of these glands. This led to an increase in the success of such surgery. Cope was also involved in the treatment of a patient, Captain Martell, who had previously had exploratory operations to search for parathyroid adenomas which had been unsuccessful. In 1932 Churchill, assisted by Cope, performed the first removal of a parathyroid adenoma from the mediastinum, having converted the initial neck operation to an open thoracotomy. By 1936 Churchill and Cope had successfully treated 30 patients with hyperparathyroidism operatively. Cope, also described primary hyperplasia of the parathyroid glands as a cause for hyperparathyroidism, as distinct from parathyroid adenoma.

During this time Cope also became the senior surgeon at the Thyroid clinic at Massachusetts General, and wrote 20 papers on thyroid surgery.

=== Treatment of burns ===
By the early 1940s Cope's interest had turned to the management of patients with burns, particularly the fluid resuscitation of these patients. In November 1942 the Cocoanut Grove fire occurred, with nearly 200 patients from the fire admitted to Massachusetts General. This event led to advances in burns care due to the research carried out in the months after the fire, led by Churchill and Cope with Benjamin Castleman, Tracy B. Mallory and Richard Schatzki. This work included the nature of pulmonary damage caused by smoke inhalation, and the "soft" technique of surface burn management, using boric petroleum-impregnated gauze dressings to allow healing instead of tanning with tannic acid. This work was published in 1943. Work carried out by Cope and Francis Moore led to methods of estimating fluid replacement needs in burns patients. This research into burns management, which continued with the support of the United States Army and Navy, led to the establishment of the Shriner's Burns Institute at Massachusetts General.

=== Treatment of cancer ===
In 1962 Cope was elected President of the American Surgical Association. He turned his attention to the surgical treatment of cancer, particularly breast cancer. He warned against reliance on radical surgery, and advocated less invasive surgery and more use of radiotherapy and chemotherapy. He also drew attention to the consideration of psychological and emotional aspects of disease in medical education. He promoted these ideas widely, publishing Man, Mind & Medicine - The Doctor's Education in 1968, and The Breast: Its Problems, Benign and Malignant: And How to Deal With Them in 1977.

Cope became Emeritus Professor of surgery at Harvard Medical School in 1969. He died on 30 April 1994 at his son's home in Woodsville, New Hampshire, the day after his wife of 62 years.

== Legacy ==
Parathyroidectomy is now a part of the standard management of cases of primary hyperparathyroidism. The management of burns, including fluid replacement, surface management and respiratory management, is based on the work carried out by Cope and his colleagues at Massachusetts General. Cancer treatment now is focused on limited surgery and adjuvant chemoradiotherapy rather than radical surgery, and medical education now takes psychosocial considerations into account.
