= Hyperpnea =

Increased volume of air taken during breathing

- Other names: Hyperpnoea
- Specialty: Pulmonology

Hyperpnea, or hyperpnoea (forced respiration), is increased volume of air taken during breathing. It can occur with or without an increase in respiration rate. It is characterized by deep breathing. It may be physiologic—as when required by oxygen to meet metabolic demand of body tissues (for example, during or after heavy exercise, or when the body lacks oxygen at high altitude or as a result of anemia, or any other condition requiring more respiration)—or it may be pathologic, as when sepsis is severe or during pulmonary edema. Hyperpnea is further characterized by the required use of muscle contraction during both inspiration and expiration. Thus, hyperpnea is intense active breathing as opposed to the passive process of normal expiration.

Hyperpnea is distinguished from tachypnea, which is a respiratory rate greater than normal, resulting in rapid and shallow breaths, but not necessarily increasing volume in breathing. Hyperpnea is also distinguished from hyperventilation, which is over-ventilation (an increase in minute ventilation), which involves an increase in volume and respiration rate, resulting in rapid and deep breaths.

The exact mechanisms behind exercise hyperpnea are not well understood, and some hypotheses are somewhat controversial. However, in addition to low oxygen, high carbon dioxide, and low pH levels, there appears to be a complex interplay of factors related to the nervous system and the respiratory centers of the brain that governs hyperpnea.

== Etymology and pronunciation ==
The word hyperpnea uses combining forms of hyper- + -pnea, yielding "excessive breathing". See pronunciation information at dyspnea.

== See also ==
- List of terms of lung size and activity
- Control of respiration
- Tachypnea
- Hyperventilation
- Dyspnea
