= Edward Delos Churchill =

American surgeon

- Born: 25 December 1895; Chenoa, Illinois
- Died: 28 August 1972 (aged 76); Vermont
- Occupation: surgeon
- Known for: thoracic surgery, describing the Churchill-Cope reflex

Edward Delos Churchill (25 December 1895 – 28 August 1972) was an American surgeon known for his work in thoracic surgery and remembered for describing the Churchill-Cope reflex.

== Biography ==
Edward Churchill was born on 25 December 1895 in Chenoa, Illinois. He attended Northwestern University, graduating B.S. in 1916 and M.A. in 1917. He then attended Harvard Medical School, graduating M.D. cum laude in 1920. He undertook his internship and residency at the Massachusetts General Hospital, and continued there as an associate surgeon; being named to that position in 1924.

He studied in Europe on a Moseley Traveling Fellowship in 1926 and 1927, spending time in Copenhagen, Munich and Berlin.

He returned to Massachusetts General in 1927, and moved to Boston City Hospital in 1928 to help found a full-time surgical unit there. In 1928 he performed the first pericardiectomy in the United States in a collaboration with Dr. Paul D. White, for the treatment of constrictive pericarditis, and developed this treatment subsequently. In 1929 he and Oliver Cope published research which described the Churchill-Cope reflex. During that time Churchill also researched pulmonary embolism, showing that multiple small emboli cause pulmonary hypertension, while a single massive embolism causes death by a different mechanism.

Churchill returned to Massachusetts General in 1931, becoming the John Homans Professor of surgery and Chief of the West Surgical Service at Massachusetts General. He developed parathyroid surgery in the treatment of primary hyperparathyroidism, performing the first mediastinal parathyroidectomy with Oliver Cope on patient Captain Charles Martell in 1932. Churchill and Cope continued to improve the success rate of parathyroid surgery in subsequent years. He also developed the use of lobectomy in the treatment of bronchiectasis, pulmonary tuberculosis and lung cancer.

During the Second World War Churchill became Theatre Consultant for surgery in the Mediterranean. He developed the use of delayed primary closure and early debridement of contaminated wounds. He established regional blood banks to increase the use of blood transfusion, and improved the process of air evacuation of wounded soldiers.

In 1946 he was President of the American Surgical Association, and continued as Professor of surgery at Massachusetts General Hospital. In 1948 the surgical services at Massachusetts General were combined, and Churchill became Chief of the General Surgical Services. He retired in 1962, and fostered an interest in the history of wound management. He died on 28 August 1972 of a myocardial infarction while walking on his farm in Vermont.
