= Platypnea =

Shortness of breath when upright

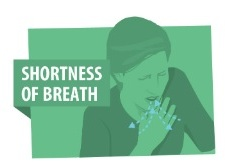
shortness of breath

Platypnea or platypnoea is shortness of breath (dyspnea) that is relieved when lying down, and worsens when sitting or standing upright. It is the opposite of orthopnea. The condition was first described in 1949 and named in 1969.

A related condition, orthodeoxia, describes the clinical finding of low oxygen saturation in the upright position, which improves when lying down.

Platypnea and orthodeoxia (low oxygen levels when in upright posture) can co-exist, and this combination is named platypnea-orthodeoxia syndrome. The syndrome is considered extremely rare however.

== Causes ==
Platypnea is usually due to either hepatopulmonary syndrome or an anatomical cardiovascular defect increasing positional right-to-left shunting (bloodflow from the right to the left part of the circulatory system) such as a patent foramen ovale. These defects include rare syndromes in which the venous blood from the liver does not pass through the lungs sufficiently, or if venous blood from the portal circulation reaches the inferior vena cava without passing through the liver sufficiently (Abernethy malformation, type 1).

== Etymology and pronunciation ==
The word platypnea uses combining forms of platy- + -pnea, from Greek platus (= flat) and pnoia (=breath). See pronunciation information at dyspnea.

== See also ==
- Paroxysmal nocturnal dyspnoea
- Orthopnea
- Trepopnea
- Bendopnea
