= Lung receptor =

Sensory cell of the lungs

Lung receptors sense irritation or inflammation in the bronchi and alveoli.
