= Electromagnetic source imaging =

- Purpose: map functional areas of the Cerebral cortex

Electromagnetic Source Imaging is a functional imaging technique, which uses Electroencephalography (EEG) and/or Magnetoencephalography measurements to map functional areas of the Cerebral cortex.

== See also ==
- Magnetoencephalography
