= Trepopnea =

Shortness of breath while lying on one side

- Differential diagnosis: congestive heart failure

Trepopnea /tɹɛpəʊpˈniːə/ is dyspnea (shortness of breath) that is sensed while lying on one side but not on the other (lateral recumbent position). It results from disease of one lung, one major bronchus, or chronic congestive heart failure that affects only a side of breathing. Patients with trepopnea in most lung diseases prefer to lie and sleep on the opposite side of the diseased lung, as the gravitation increases perfusion of the lower lung. Increased perfusion in diseased lung would increase shunting and hypoxemia, resulting in worsening shortness of breath when lying on the affected lung. To maximize function of the healthier lung and to relieve dyspnea, the patient is best to lie on the side of the healthier lung, so that it receives adequate perfusion. Patients with chronic heart failure prefer to lie mostly on the right side, to enable a better blood return, whereby cardiac output is augmented. One exception is pleural effusion, in which the patients experience less dyspnea when lying on the side of the pleural effusion, instead of the healthy lung.

== See also ==
- Orthopnea
- Paroxysmal nocturnal dyspnoea
- Platypnea
- Bendopnea
