= Paroxysmal nocturnal dyspnoea =

Attack of severe shortness of breath and coughing, generally at night

- Specialty: Pulmonology

Paroxysmal nocturnal dyspnea or paroxysmal nocturnal dyspnoea (PND) is an attack of severe shortness of breath and coughing that generally occurs at night. It usually awakens the person from sleep, and may be quite frightening. PND, as well as simple orthopnea, may be relieved by sitting upright at the side of the bed with legs dangling, as symptoms typically occur when the person is recumbent, or lying down.

== Risk factors ==
Since paroxysmal nocturnal dyspnea occurs mainly because of heart or lung problems, common risk factors include those that affect the function of the heart and lungs. Risk factors for cardiac diseases include high blood pressure, high cholesterol, diabetes, obesity, and a lifestyle lacking exercise and a healthy diet. Risk factors for lung diseases include tobacco use, including second hand smoke, pollution, exposure to hazardous fumes, and allergens.

== Mechanism ==
PND can be explained by mechanisms similar to those of orthopnea and typical dyspnea. When a person is recumbent, or is lying down, blood is redistributed from the lower extremities and abdominal cavity (splanchnic circulation) to the lungs. Failure to accommodate this redistribution results in decreased vital capacity and pulmonary compliance, further causing the shortness of breath experienced in PND. In addition to the redistribution of blood in the body, most cases of dyspnea are accompanied by an increase in the overall work of breathing, often caused by abnormal pulmonary mechanisms.

The perception of dyspnea is theorized to be a complicated connection between peripheral receptors, neural pathways, and the central nervous system. Receptors in the chest wall and central airways, as well receptors in the respiratory center of the central nervous system, produce an increased requirement for ventilation which is not matched by respiratory output, resulting in the conscious recognition of dyspnea. Respiratory muscles and vagal afferent neural pathways relay information from the chest wall/airways to the central nervous system, facilitating the presentation of dyspnea.

In people with underlying congestive heart failure, this redistribution may overload the pulmonary circulation, causing increased pulmonary congestion. In congestive heart failure, left ventricular dysfunction will also increase pulmonary congestion, so further congestion caused by the redistribution of blood volume upon laying down will worsen any dyspnea.

Other theories exist for why PND occurs, especially in those where PND only occurs while sleeping. Theories include decreased responsiveness of the respiratory center in the brain and decreased adrenergic activity in the myocardium during sleep.

== Diagnosis ==
Paroxysmal nocturnal dyspnea is a serious medical symptom that can develop into worsening conditions. Many tests can be done in order to evaluate the cause of paroxysmal nocturnal dyspnea. Because it is commonly associated with heart failure, tests that may be run mainly focus on measuring the function and capability of the heart. Common tests may include an echocardiography, cardiac magnetic resonance imaging (MRI), coronary artery angiogram, chest x-ray or chest CT scan, blood tests, physical exams, or a myocardial biopsy. The diagnostic workup will vary depending on the suspected cause. For example, for people who enter the emergency room with shortness of breath, a diagnosis is achieved through a physical examination, electrocardiography, chest radiograph, and if necessary, a serum BNP level.

As a subjective symptom self-reported by people, dyspnea is difficult to characterize since its severity cannot be measured. Dyspnea can come in many forms, but it is commonly known as shortness of breath or having difficulty breathing. People presenting with dyspnea usually show signs of rapid and shallow breathing, use of their respiratory accessory muscles, and may have underlying conditions causing the dyspnea, such as cardiac or pulmonary diseases. With paroxysmal nocturnal dyspnea specifically, it is felt while sleeping and causes a person to wake up after about 1 to 2 hours of sleep.

More serious forms of dyspnea can be identified through accompanying findings, such as low blood pressure, decreased respiratory rate, altered mental status, hypoxia, cyanosis, stridor, or unstable arrhythmias. When these symptoms accompany PND, it is typically a red flag that something more serious is causing the dyspnea presentation and should be evaluated further.

Paroxysmal nocturnal dyspnea is a common symptom of several heart conditions such as heart failure with preserved ejection fraction, in addition to asthma, chronic obstructive pulmonary disease, and sleep apnea. Other symptoms that may be seen alongside paroxysmal nocturnal dyspnea are weakness, orthopnea, edema, fatigue, and dyspnea.

=== Differential Diagnoses ===
Dyspnea affects about 25% of people in the ambulatory care setting and is a common symptom of many underlying conditions. Dyspnea is a subjective symptom, meaning it can only be expressed by the person experiencing it, and it is imperative in diagnosis to distinguish it from other breathing problems. Dyspnea is typically the sensation of feeling short of breath and should not be confused with rapid breathing (tachypnea), excessive breathing (hyperpnea) or hyperventilation. Once dyspnea is properly identified, it is important to differentiate between acute and chronic dyspnea, typically through a detailed physical exam and observation of the person's breathing patterns. The most common causes of dyspnea are cardiac (cardiac asthma) and pulmonary conditions, like congestive heart failure with preserved ejection fraction, COPD, or pneumonia. Less commonly, some cases of dyspnea can be attributed to neuromuscular diseases of the chest wall or anxiety. When distinguishing PND from typical dyspnea, it is important to identify common characteristics of PND. Some important criteria to identify are temporal characteristics (i.e., acute or chronic onset, intermittent or persistent symptoms), situational characteristics (i.e., symptoms at rest, upon exertion, upon different body positions, or upon special exposures), and pathogenic characteristics (i.e., physiologic or mental conditions). PND typically presents at night during sleep, especially while the person is laying down, distinguishing PND from typical dyspnea.

== Treatment ==
Treatment for paroxysmal nocturnal dyspnea depends on the underlying cause. If the underlying cause is heart failure with preserved ejection fraction (HFpEF, when part of the heart does not fill properly with blood), treatments can include diuretics, beta blockers, and ACE inhibitors. Another potential underlying cause of PND is central sleep apnea (CSA) with Cheyne-Stokes Breathing (CSB), for which the treatment recommended by the American Academy of Sleep Medicine is continuous positive airway pressure (CPAP) and nocturnal home oxygen therapy (HOT).

The shortness of breath sensation felt from PND can typically be relieved by maintaining an upright position while sleeping.

Potential Underlying Cause	Treatment
central sleep apnea with Cheyne-Strokes breathing	continuous positive airway pressure (CPAP)
heart failure with preserved ejection fraction (HFpEF)	diuretics, beta blockers, ACE inhibitors

== Epidemiology ==
While a small source of data exists on the prevalence of PND, a large pool of data exists on the epidemiology of dyspnea in general. Reports show that 7.4% of people reporting to the emergency room identify dyspnea as one of their symptoms, with 1-4% of people identifying dyspnea as their primary concern. Dyspnea is often the cause of situational changes in a person's environment or activity. For example, 10% of people complain of dyspnea while walking on flat ground to their primary care provider (PCP), while 25% of people complain of dyspnea upon more intense exertion (i.e. climbing stairs or a hill) to their PCP. Of these people seeing a PCP, 1-4% see their provider for dyspnea specifically. After identifying the cause of dyspnea, most people continue on to see a specialist to manage dyspnea presentation and address underlying conditions. Roughly 15-50% of people who are regularly seen by a cardiologist are seen in regard to dyspnea symptoms, while just under 60% of people regularly see a pneumonologist in regard to their dyspnea.

Additionally, there have been epidemiological studies performed on central sleep apnea in heart failure. Central sleep apnea in heart failure's epidemiology is relevant, as sleep apnea and heart failure have both been associated in people with paroxysmal nocturnal dyspnea. According to the study, researchers were able to conclude that ~70% of people with heart failure had breathing disorders while they slept, while half of that ~70% also experienced central sleep apnea with Cheyne Stokes respiration (CSA-CSR). Atrial fibrillation, the male gender, an age greater than 60, and awake PaCO_{2} being less than or equal to 38 mm Hg were all risk factors associated with CSA-CSR.

== Special Populations ==
Pregnancy

In people who are pregnant, the presence of paroxysmal nocturnal dyspnea is abnormal. Further investigation and diagnostic tests should be done in order to prevent harm to the fetus and to the mother.

Hypereosinophilic Syndrome (HES)

Hypereosinophilic syndrome is a combination of rare complications that are explained by an increased amount of serum and persistent tissue eosinophilia. An uncommon disorder that is known to be associated with Hypereosinophilic Syndrome is Löffler endocarditis.
