= Respiration rate =

The respiration rate is a parameter which is used in ecological and agronomical modeling.

In theoretical production ecology and aquaculture, it typically refers to respiration per unit of time (usually loss of biomass by respiration per unit of weight), also referred to as relative respiration rate. In theoretical production ecology, biomass is expressed as dry weight, in aquaculture as wet fish weight. The respiration rate is dependent of species, type of tissue or organ studied and temperature.

== See also ==
- Respiratory rate
