= Orthopnea =

Shortness of breath when lying flat

- Other names: Orthopnoea
- Pronunciation: /ɔːrˈθɒpniə/
- Specialty: Cardiology

Orthopnea or orthopnoea is shortness of breath (dyspnea) that occurs when lying flat, causing the person to have to sleep propped up in bed or sitting in a chair. It is commonly seen as a late manifestation of heart failure, resulting from fluid redistribution into the central circulation, causing an increase in pulmonary capillary pressure and causing difficulty in breathing. It is also seen in cases of abdominal obesity or pulmonary disease. Orthopnea is the opposite of platypnea, shortness of breath that worsens when sitting or standing upright.

== Causes ==
Orthopnea is often a symptom of left ventricular heart failure and/or cardiogenic pulmonary edema. It can also occur in those with asthma and chronic bronchitis, as well as those with sleep apnea or panic disorder. It is also as associated with polycystic liver disease. From a neuromuscular perspective, orthopnea is potentially a sign of severe diaphragmatic weakness. Under such circumstances, patients may describe shortness of breath when they bend over (e.g. when tying shoelaces), called bendopnea.

== Mechanism ==
Orthopnea is due to increased distribution of blood to the pulmonary circulation when a person lies flat or closer to a horizontal position. Lying flat decreases the inhibitory effect that the gravity usually has on the blood when coming back to the heart from the lower extremities of the body. This increases the right sided venous return. In a normal person, this redistribution of blood has little effect on respiratory function as the left ventricle has the adequate capacity to suddenly increase its stroke volume (as a result of the Frank-Starling mechanism). In a person with heart failure, the left ventricle has an inadequate capacity to respond to increased arrival of blood from the pulmonary circulation. This leads to the pooling up of blood in the pulmonary circulation. The increased intra-parenchymal pulmonary intravascular pressure can also result in hydrostatic pressure related fluid transudation into the alveoli, thus causing cardiogenic pulmonary edema and further worsening shortness of breath. Thus, shortness of breath is commonly experienced after a reasonably short time lying near to flat for a person with left ventricular failure. This is different from the dyspnea experienced by someone with lung parenchymal pathology (both restrictive and obstructive) when lying down, which is sudden and instead related to an acute change in diaphragmatic/accessory respiratory muscle mechanical advantage lost when moving the body into a more horizontal position.

== Diagnosis ==
Diagnosis is based mostly on the clinical features and symptoms, as well as finding causes like heart failure.

== Treatment ==
Based on the cause, orthopnea can be treated with respiratory support devices such as CPAP or biPAP while the disease causing it is addressed.

== Etymology ==
The word orthopnea uses combining forms of ortho- + -pnea, from Greek ortho, straight, regular, + pnoia, breath. See pronunciation information at dyspnea.

== See also ==
- Paroxysmal nocturnal dyspnoea
- Platypnea
- Trepopnea
- Bendopnea
- Shortness of breath
