= Shortness of breath =

Feeling of difficulty breathing

- Other names: Dyspnea, dyspnoea, breathlessness, difficulty (in/of) breathing; respiratory distress
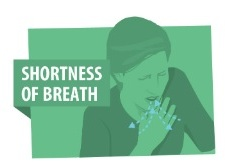
- Pronunciation: Dyspnea: /dɪspˈniːə/; see also § Etymology and pronunciation
- Specialty: Pulmonology

Shortness of breath (SOB), known as dyspnea (in AmE) or dyspnoea (in BrE), is an uncomfortable feeling of not being able to breathe well enough. The American Thoracic Society defines it as "a subjective experience of breathing discomfort that consists of qualitatively distinct sensations that vary in intensity", and recommends evaluating dyspnea by assessing the intensity of its distinct sensations, the degree of distress and discomfort involved, and its burden or impact on the patient's activities of daily living. Distinct sensations include effort/work to breathe, chest tightness or pain, and "air hunger" (the feeling of not enough oxygen). The tripod position is often assumed to be a sign.

Dyspnea is a normal symptom of heavy physical exertion but becomes pathological if it occurs in unexpected situations, when resting or during light exertion. In 85% of cases it is due to asthma, pneumonia, Laryngopharyngeal reflux, cardiac ischemia, COVID-19, interstitial lung disease, congestive heart failure, chronic obstructive pulmonary disease, or psychogenic causes, such as panic disorder and anxiety. The best treatment to relieve or even remove shortness of breath typically depends on the underlying cause.

== Definition ==
Dyspnea, in medical terms, is "shortness of breath".

The American Thoracic Society defines dyspnea as:

"A subjective experience of breathing discomfort that consists of qualitatively distinct sensations that vary in intensity."

Other definitions describe it as "difficulty in breathing", "disordered or inadequate breathing", "uncomfortable awareness of breathing", and as the experience of "breathlessness" (which may be either acute or chronic).

== Causes ==
While shortness of breath is generally caused by disorders of the cardiac or respiratory system, others such as the neurological, musculoskeletal, endocrine, gastrointestinal system (reflux/LPR), hematologic, and psychiatric systems may be the cause.

DiagnosisPro, an online medical expert system, listed 497 distinct causes in October 2010. The most common cardiovascular causes are myocardial infarction and heart failure, while common pulmonary causes include chronic obstructive pulmonary disease, asthma, pneumothorax, pulmonary edema, and pneumonia.

On a pathophysiological basis, the causes can be divided into (1) increased awareness of normal breathing such as during an anxiety attack, (2) an increase in the work of breathing, and (3) an abnormality in the ventilatory or respiratory system. Ischemic strokes, hemorrhages, tumors, infections, seizures, and traumas at the brain stem can also cause shortness of breath, making them the only neurological causes of shortness of breath.

The tempo of onset and the duration of dyspnea are useful in knowing the etiology of dyspnea. Acute shortness of breath is usually connected with sudden physiological changes, such as laryngeal edema, bronchospasm, myocardial infarction, pulmonary embolism, or pneumothorax. Patients with COPD and idiopathic pulmonary fibrosis (IPF) have a mild onset and gradual progression of dyspnea on exertion, punctuated by acute exacerbations of shortness of breath. In contrast, most asthmatics do not have daily symptoms, but have intermittent episodes of dyspnea, cough, and chest tightness that are usually associated with specific triggers, such as an upper respiratory tract infection or exposure to allergens.

=== Acute coronary syndrome ===
Acute coronary syndrome frequently presents with retrosternal chest discomfort and difficulty catching the breath. It however may atypically present with shortness of breath alone. Risk factors include old age, smoking, hypertension, hyperlipidemia, and diabetes. An electrocardiogram and cardiac enzymes are important both for diagnosis and directing treatment. Treatment involves measures to decrease the oxygen requirement of the heart and efforts to increase blood flow.

=== COVID-19 ===
People that have been infected by COVID-19 may have symptoms such as a fever, dry cough, loss of smell and taste, and in moderate to severe cases, shortness of breath. Dyspnea is one of the three major symptoms of Long COVID, but this subjective symptom does not track with the severity of objective markers of inflammation.

=== Congestive heart failure ===
Congestive heart failure frequently presents with shortness of breath with exertion, orthopnea, and paroxysmal nocturnal dyspnea. It affects between 1 and 2% of the general United States population and occurs in 10% of those over 65 years old. Risk factors for acute decompensation include high dietary salt intake, medication noncompliance, cardiac ischemia, abnormal heart rhythms, kidney failure, pulmonary emboli, hypertension, and infections. Treatment efforts are directed toward decreasing lung congestion.

=== Chronic obstructive pulmonary disease ===
People with chronic obstructive pulmonary disease (COPD), most commonly emphysema or chronic bronchitis, frequently have chronic shortness of breath and a chronic productive cough. An acute exacerbation presents with increased shortness of breath and sputum production. COPD is a risk factor for pneumonia; thus this condition should be ruled out. In an acute exacerbation treatment is with a combination of anticholinergics, beta_{2}-adrenoceptor agonists, steroids and possibly positive pressure ventilation.

=== Asthma ===
Asthma is the most common reason for presenting to the emergency room with shortness of breath. It is the most common lung disease in both developing and developed countries affecting about 5% of the population. Other symptoms include wheezing, tightness in the chest, and a nonproductive cough. Inhaled corticosteroids are the preferred treatment for children; however, these drugs can reduce the growth rate. Acute symptoms are treated with short-acting bronchodilators.

=== Pneumothorax ===
Pneumothorax presents typically with pleuritic chest pain of acute onset and shortness of breath not improved with oxygen. Physical findings may include absent breath sounds on one side of the chest, jugular venous distension, and tracheal deviation.

=== Pneumonia ===
The symptoms of pneumonia are fever, productive cough, shortness of breath, and pleuritic chest pain. Inspiratory crackles may be heard on exam. A chest x-ray can be useful to differentiate pneumonia from congestive heart failure. As the cause is usually a bacterial infection, antibiotics are typically used for treatment.

=== Pulmonary embolism ===
Pulmonary embolism classically presents with an acute onset of shortness of breath. Other presenting symptoms include pleuritic chest pain, cough, hemoptysis, and fever. Risk factors include deep vein thrombosis, recent surgery, cancer, and previous thromboembolism. It must always be considered in those with acute onset of shortness of breath owing to its high risk of mortality. Diagnosis, however, may be difficult and Wells Score is often used to assess the clinical probability. Treatment, depending on the severity of symptoms, typically starts with anticoagulants; the presence of ominous signs (low blood pressure) may warrant the use of thrombolytic drugs.

=== Anemia ===
Anemia that develops gradually usually presents with exertional dyspnea, fatigue, weakness, and tachycardia. It may lead to heart failure. Anaemia is often a cause of dyspnea. Menstruation, particularly if excessive, can contribute to anaemia and consequential dyspnea in women. Headaches are a symptom of dyspnea in patients with anaemia. Some patients report a numb sensation in their head, and others have reported blurred vision caused by hypotension behind the eye due to a lack of oxygen and pressure; these patients have reported severe head pains, which can lead to permanent brain damage. Symptoms can include loss of concentration, focus, fatigue, language faculty impairment, and memory loss.

=== Cancer ===
Shortness of breath is common in people with cancer and may be caused by numerous different factors. The most commonly reported cancer types that may affect breathing are lung cancer and mesothelioma. In people with advanced cancer, periods with severe shortness of breath may occur, along with a more continuous feeling of breathlessness.

Treatments for breathlessness include both non-pharmacological and pharmacological approaches. Non-pharmacological interventions that have been shown to improve breathlessness include the use of fans, exercise, and pulmonary rehabilitation. Moderate evidence suggests the use of airflow interventions such as handheld fans has been shown to effectively reduce the feeling of breathlessness in patients with advanced cancer.

Pharmacological treatments involve bronchodilators and corticosteroids to address the underlying causes of shortness of breath, as well as opioids or anti-anxiety medications to alleviate symptoms. However, a review of breathlessness and exercise capacity in patients with advanced cancer proved the use of both opioids and anxiolytics were not effective in improving symptoms when compared to placebo. Integrative medicine options, including acupuncture, acupressure, reflexology, and meditation, have been found to have a beneficial effect.

Additional interventions can help alleviate breathlessness when aligned with a patient's preference and overall diagnosis. These may include medical procedures like stenting, thoracentesis, or placement of pleura catheters to address bronchial obstructions or pleural effusions; cancer-directed treatments such as radiation therapy; and management of related symptoms often present in advanced cancer, including pain, can also influence the severity of breathlessness.

While these treatments are effective in reducing breathlessness in cancer patients, a systematic review reported various treatment-related side effects including equipment-related distress, fatigue, and constipation.

=== Psychological ===
One common symptom of panic disorder is shortness of breath. Panic attacks typically present with hyperventilation, sweating, and numbness. Panic disorder is usually regarded as a diagnosis of exclusion in cases of shortness of breath.

When the cause of breathlessness is psychological, a common symptom is excessive sighing. This is sometimes referred to as "sigh syndrome" or "sighing dyspnea". Sigh syndrome is characterized by recurrent attempts to take a deep breath, prompted by a feeling of inability to do so, followed by a prolonged and often audible exhalation (i.e. a sigh). Sigh syndrome is not dangerous and is usually self-limited, though it can be recurrent.

=== Other ===
Other important or common causes of shortness of breath include cardiac tamponade, anaphylaxis, interstitial lung disease, and pulmonary hypertension. It is more common among people with relatively small lungs. Around 2/3 of women experience shortness of breath as a part of a normal pregnancy.

Cardiac tamponade presents with dyspnea, tachycardia, elevated jugular venous pressure, and pulsus paradoxus. The gold standard for diagnosis is ultrasound.

Anaphylaxis typically begins over a few minutes in a person with a previous history of the same. Other symptoms include urticaria, throat swelling, and gastrointestinal upset. The primary treatment is epinephrine.

Interstitial lung disease presents with a gradual onset of shortness of breath typically with a history of predisposing environmental exposure. Shortness of breath is often the only symptom in those with tachydysrhythmias.

Neurological conditions such as spinal cord injury, phrenic nerve injuries, Guillain–Barré syndrome, amyotrophic lateral sclerosis, multiple sclerosis and muscular dystrophy can all cause an individual to experience shortness of breath. Shortness of breath can also occur as a result of vocal cord dysfunction (VCD).

Dyspnea can be a symptom of mast cell activation syndrome (MCAS).

Sarcoidosis is an inflammatory disease of unknown etiology that generally presents with dry cough, fatigue, and shortness of breath, although multiple organ systems may be affected, with the involvement of sites such as the eyes, the skin, and the joints.

In January 2025, Metro reported that vaping increases the risk of inflammation of the lungs by exposing users to the vaporized elements of the oil. Popcorn lung is considered to be one such inflammatory response, and it causes respiratory symptoms such as coughing and dyspnea.

== Pathophysiology ==
Different physiological pathways may lead to shortness of breath including via ASIC chemoreceptors, mechanoreceptors, and lung receptors.

It is thought that three main components contribute to dyspnea: afferent signals, efferent signals, and central information processing. It is believed the central processing in the brain compares the afferent and efferent signals; and dyspnea results when a "mismatch" occurs between the two: such as when the need for ventilation (afferent signaling) is not being met by physical breathing (efferent signaling).

Afferent signals are sensory neuronal signals that ascend to the brain. Afferent neurons significant in dyspnea arise from a large number of sources including the carotid bodies, medulla, lungs, and chest wall. Chemoreceptors in the carotid bodies and medulla supply information regarding the blood gas levels of O_{2}, CO_{2} and H^{+}. In the lungs, juxtacapillary (J) receptors are sensitive to pulmonary interstitial edema, while stretch receptors signal bronchoconstriction. Muscle spindles in the chest wall signal the stretch and tension of the respiratory muscles. Thus, poor ventilation leads to hypercapnia, left heart failure leading to interstitial edema (impairing gas exchange), asthma causing bronchoconstriction (limiting airflow) and muscle fatigue leading to ineffective respiratory muscle action could all contribute to a feeling of dyspnea.

Efferent signals are the motor neuronal signals descending to the respiratory muscles. The most important respiratory muscle is the diaphragm. Other respiratory muscles include the external and internal intercostal muscles, the abdominal muscles, and the accessory breathing muscles. As the brain receives its plentiful supply of afferent information relating to ventilation, it can compare it to the current level of respiration as determined by the efferent signals. If the level of respiration is inappropriate for the body's status then dyspnea might occur. There is also a psychological component to dyspnea, as some people may become aware of their breathing in such circumstances but not experience the typical distress of dyspnea.

== Diagnosis ==
MRC breathlessness scale
Grade	Degree of dyspnea
1	no dyspnea except with strenuous exercise
2	dyspnea when walking up an incline or hurrying on the level
3	walks slower than most on the level, or stops after 15 minutes of walking on the level
4	stops after a few minutes of walking on the level
5	with minimal activity such as getting dressed, too dyspneic to leave the house

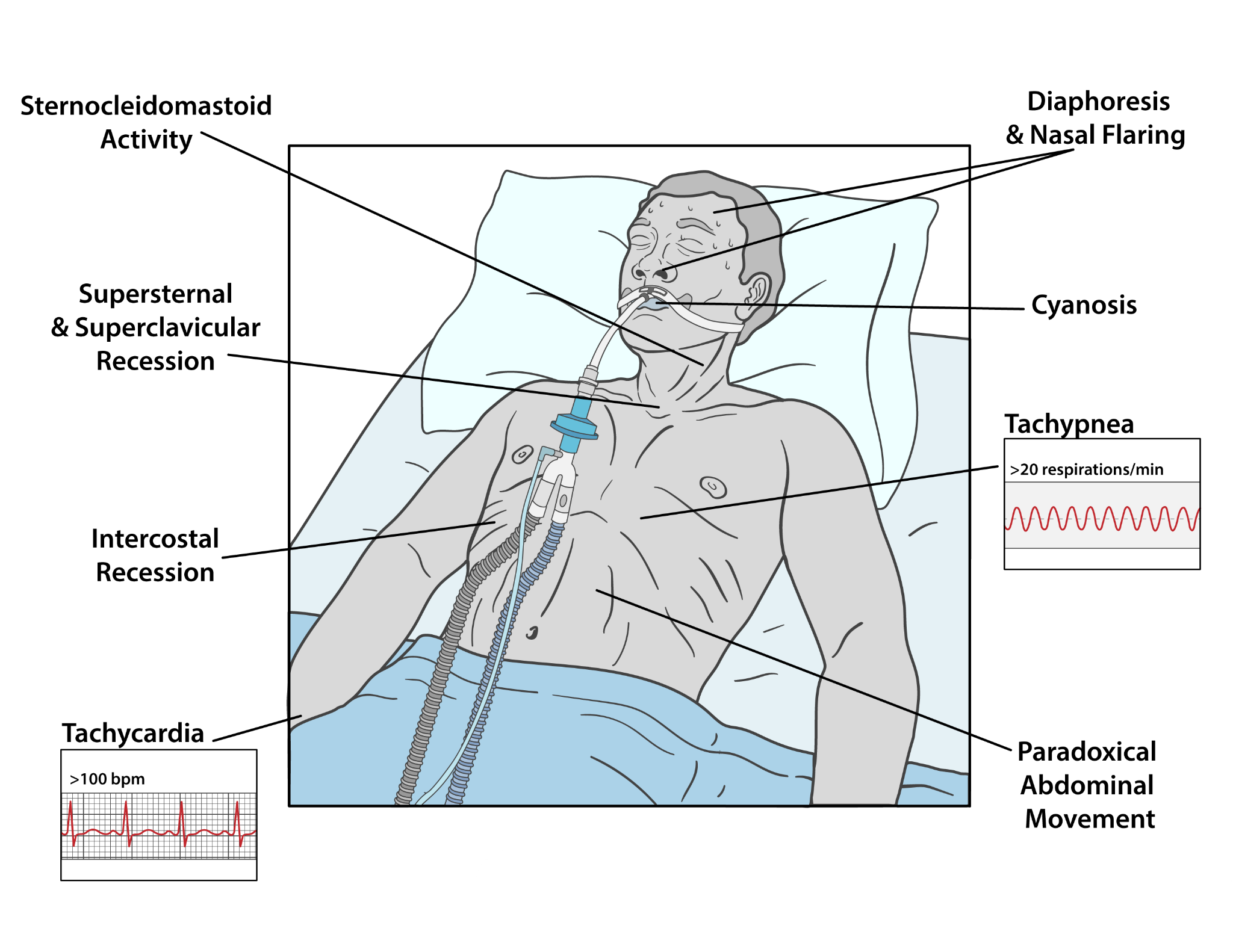
Signs of respiratory distress illustration

The initial approach to evaluation begins with an assessment of the airway, breathing, and circulation followed by a medical history and physical examination. Signs and symptoms that represent significant severity include hypotension, hypoxemia, tracheal deviation, altered mental status, unstable dysrhythmia, stridor, intercostal indrawing, cyanosis, tripod positioning, pronounced use of accessory muscles (sternocleidomastoid, scalenes) and absent breath sounds.

A number of scales may be used to quantify the degree of shortness of breath. It may be subjectively rated on a scale from 1 to 10 with descriptors associated with the number (The Modified Borg Scale). The MRC breathlessness scale suggests five grades of dyspnea based on the circumstances and severity in which it arises.

=== Blood tests ===
Several labs may help determine the cause of shortness of breath. D-dimer, while useful to rule out a pulmonary embolism in those who are at low risk, is not of much value if it is positive, as it may be positive in several conditions that lead to shortness of breath. A low level of brain natriuretic peptide is useful in ruling out congestive heart failure; however, a high level, while supportive of the diagnosis, could also be due to advanced age, kidney failure, acute coronary syndrome, or a large pulmonary embolism.

=== Imaging ===
A chest x-ray is useful to confirm or rule out a pneumothorax, pulmonary edema, or pneumonia. Spiral computed tomography with intravenous radiocontrast is the imaging study of choice to evaluate for pulmonary embolism.

== Treatment ==
The primary treatment of shortness of breath is directed at its underlying cause. Extra supplemental oxygen is effective in those with hypoxia; however, this has no effect in those with normal blood oxygen saturations.

=== Physiotherapy ===
Individuals can benefit from a variety of physical therapy interventions. Persons with neurological/neuromuscular abnormalities may have breathing difficulties due to weak or paralyzed intercostal, abdominal and/or other muscles needed for ventilation. Some physical therapy interventions for this population include active assisted cough techniques, volume augmentation such as breath stacking, education about body position and ventilation patterns and movement strategies to facilitate breathing. Pulmonary rehabilitation may alleviate symptoms in some people, such as those with COPD, but will not cure the underlying disease. Fan therapy to the face has been shown to relieve shortness of breath in patients with a variety of advanced illnesses including cancer. The mechanism of action is thought to be stimulation of the trigeminal nerve.

=== Palliative medicine ===
Systemic immediate release opioids are beneficial in emergently reducing the symptom severity of shortness of breath due to both cancer and non-cancer causes; long-acting/sustained-release opioids are also used to prevent/continue treatment of dyspnea in palliative setting. There is a lack of evidence to recommend midazolam, nebulised opioids, the use of gas mixtures, or cognitive-behavioral therapy yet.

=== Non-pharmacological techniques ===
Non-pharmacological interventions provide key tools for the management of breathlessness. Potentially beneficial approaches include active management of psychosocial issues (anxiety, depression, etc.), and implementation of self-management strategies, such as physical and mental relaxation techniques, pacing techniques, energy conservation techniques, learning exercises to control breathing, and education. The use of a fan may be beneficial. Cognitive behavioural therapy may also be helpful.

=== Pharmacological treatment ===
For people with severe, chronic, or uncontrollable breathlessness, non-pharmacological approaches to treating breathlessness may be combined with medication. For people who have cancer that is causing the breathlessness, medications that have been suggested include opioids, benzodiazepines, oxygen, and steroids. Results of recent systematic reviews and meta-analyses found opioids were not necessarily associated with more effectiveness in treatment for patients with advanced cancer.

Ensuring that the balance between side effects and adverse effects from medications and potential improvements from medications needs to be carefully considered before prescribing medication. The use of systematic corticosteroids in palliative care for people with cancer is common, however, the effectiveness and potential adverse effects of this approach in adults with cancer have not been well studied.

== Epidemiology ==
Shortness of breath is the primary reason 3.5% of people present to the emergency department in the United States. Of these individuals, approximately 51% are admitted to the hospital and 13% die within a year. Some studies have suggested that up to 27% of hospitalized people develop dyspnea, while in dying patients 75% will experience it. Acute shortness of breath is the most common reason people requiring palliative care visit an emergency department. Up to 70% of adults with advanced cancer also experience dyspnoea.

== Etymology and pronunciation ==
English dyspnea comes from Latin dyspnoea, from Greek dyspnoia, from dyspnoos, which literally means "disordered breathing". Its combining forms (dys- + -pnea) are familiar from other medical words, such as dysfunction (dys- + function) and apnea (a- + -pnea). The most common pronunciation in medical English is /dɪspˈniːə/ disp-NEE-ə, with the p expressed and the stress on the /niː/ syllable. But pronunciations with a silent p in pn (as also in pneumo-) are common (/dɪsˈniːə/ or /ˈdɪsniə/), as are those with the stress on the first syllable (/ˈdɪspniə/ or /ˈdɪsniə/).

In English, the various -pnea-suffixed words commonly used in medicine do not follow one clear pattern as to whether the /niː/ syllable or the one preceding it is stressed; the p is usually expressed but is sometimes silent depending on the word. The following collation or list shows the preponderance of how major dictionaries pronounce and transcribe them (less-used variants are omitted):

Group	Term	Combining forms	Preponderance of transcriptions (major dictionaries)
good	eupnea	eu- + -pnea	/juːpˈniːə/ yoop-NEE-ə
bad	dyspnea	dys- + -pnea	/dɪspˈniːə/ disp-NEE-ə, /ˈdɪspniə/ DISP-nee-ə
fast	tachypnea	tachy- + -pnea	/ˌtækɪpˈniːə/ TAK-ip-NEE-ə
slow	bradypnea	brady- + -pnea	/ˌbreɪdɪpˈniːə/ BRAY-dip-NEE-ə
upright	orthopnea	ortho- + -pnea	/ɔːrˈθɒpniə/ or-THOP-nee-ə, /ɔːrθəpˈniːə/ or-thəp-NEE-ə
supine	platypnea	platy- + -pnea	/pləˈtɪpniə/ plə-TIP-nee-ə
bent over	bendopnea	bend + -o- + -pnea	/bɛndˈɒpniə/ bend-OP-nee-ə
excessive	hyperpnea	hyper- + -pnea	/ˌhaɪpərpˈniːə/ HY-pərp-NEE-ə
insufficient	hypopnea	hypo- + -pnea	/haɪˈpɒpniə/ hy-POP-nee-ə, /ˌhaɪpoʊˈniːə/ high-poh-NEE-ə
absent	apnea	a- + -pnea	/ˈæpniə/ AP-nee-ə, /æpˈniːə/ ap-NEE-ə

== See also ==
- List of terms of lung size and activity
- Bronchospasm
- Orthopnea
