= Bradypnea =

Abnormally slow breathing

- Other names: Bradypnoea
- Pronunciation: /ˌbreɪdɪpˈniːə/ BRAY-dip-NEE-ə
- Specialty: Pulmonology

Bradypnea is abnormally slow breathing. It is the opposite of tachypnea.

== Signs and symptoms ==
Bradypnea may occur in isolation with no other symptoms or, depending on the underlying cause, be accompanied by other symptoms of breathing problems or signs of disease recognized by a medical professional.

== Causes ==
Abnormally slow or shallow breathing may be caused by overdoses of drugs including opioids, benzodiazepines, and alcohol, as well as neuromuscular disorders such as Duchenne muscular dystrophy and amyotrophic lateral sclerosis (ALS). Bradypnea may also be seen in patients with respiratory distress who are tiring from respiratory effort.

== Treatment ==
Treatment depends on the underlying medical issue causing bradypnea. Supportive care may be given, such as supplemental oxygen. If an opioid overdose is suspected, naloxone is given and may rapidly improve the rate of breathing.

== Etymology ==
The word bradypnea uses combining forms of brady- + -pnea, from (Greek from bradys, slow + pnoia, breath).

== See also ==
- List of terms of lung size and activity
- Respiratory rate
- Tachypnea
