= Tachypnea =

Abnormally rapid and shallow breathing

- Other names: Tachypnoea
- Pronunciation: /ˌtækɪpˈniːə/
- Specialty: Pulmonology

Tachypnea, also spelt tachypnoea, is a respiratory rate greater than normal, resulting in abnormally rapid and shallow breathing.

In adult humans at rest, any respiratory rate of 12–20 per minute is considered clinically normal, with tachypnea being any rate above that. Children have significantly higher resting ventilatory rates, which decline rapidly during the first three years of life and then steadily until around 18 years. Tachypnea can be an early indicator of pneumonia and other lung diseases in children, and is often an outcome of a brain injury.

== Distinction from other breathing terms ==
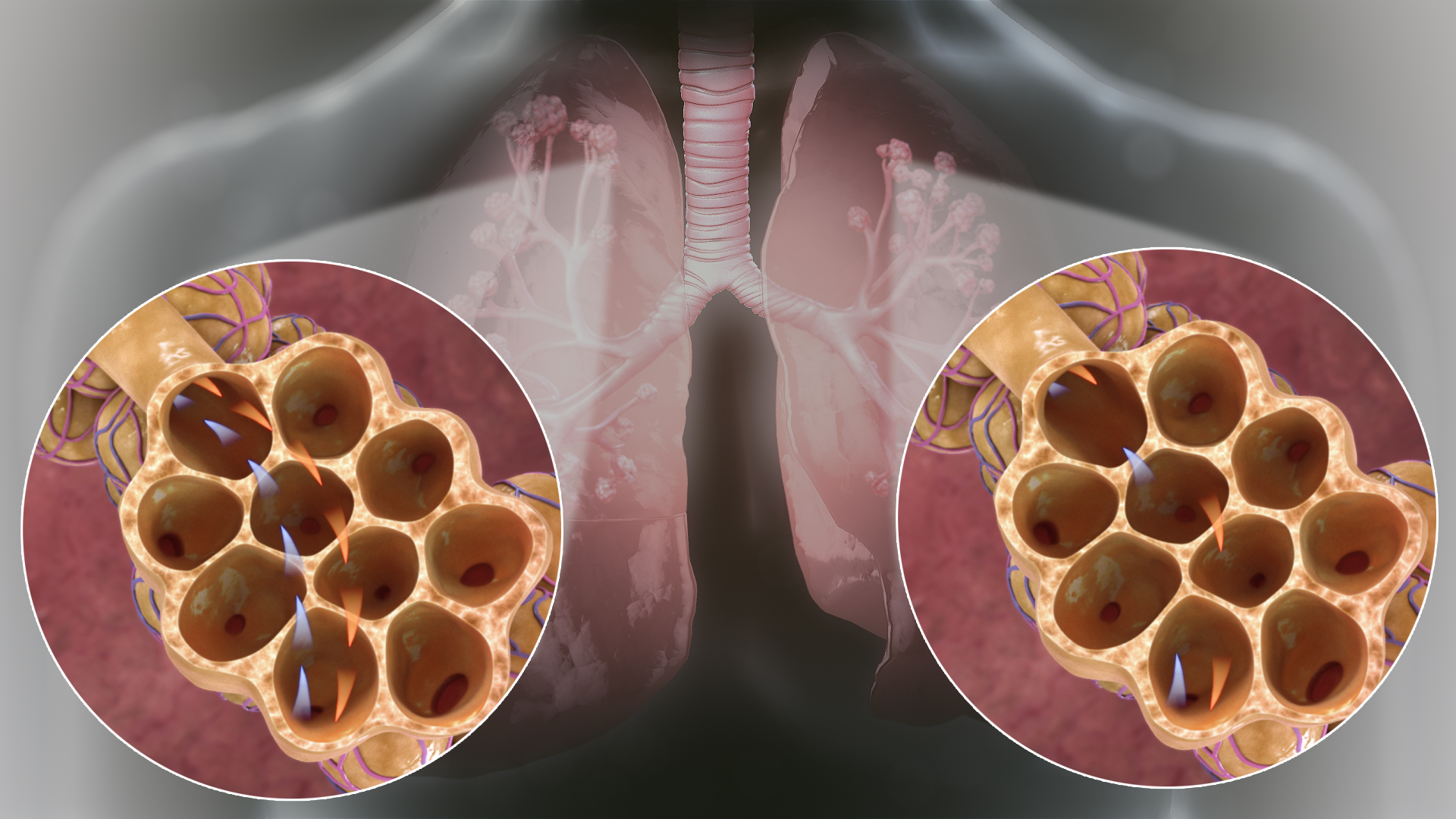
A comparison of hyperventilation (left) and hyperpnea (right).

Different sources produce different classifications for breathing terms.

Some of the public describe tachypnea as any rapid breathing. Hyperventilation is then described as increased ventilation of the alveoli (which can occur through increased rate or depth of breathing, or a mix of both) where there is a smaller rise in metabolic carbon dioxide relative to this increase in ventilation. Hyperpnea, on the other hand, is defined as breathing an increased volume of air, with or without an increase in respiration rate.

Others give another classification: tachypnea is as any rapid breathing, hyperventilation is increased rate of breathing at rest, hyperpnea is an increase in breathing that is appropriately proportional to an increase in metabolic rate.

A third paradigm is: tachypnea is abnormally rapid and shallow respiration (though some may argue this is inaccurate as breathing differs from respiration), hyperventilation is increased rate or depth of respiration to abnormal levels causing decreased levels of blood carbon dioxide and hyperpnea is any increase in breathing rate or depth that is not normal.

=== Threshold definition ===
As normal respiratory rate varies with age, the definition of tachypnea also varies with age.

Age	Threshold breaths per minute
0 - 2 months	> 60
2 - 12 months	> 50
1 - 5 years	> 40
5-12 years	> 30
>12 years	> 20

== Causes ==
Tachypnea may have physiological or pathological causes. Both of these categories would include large lists of individual causes.

=== Physiological causes ===
Physiological causes of tachypnea include exercise. This type is usually not a cause of concern unless it's excessive.

=== Pathological causes ===
Pathological causes of tachypnea include sepsis, compensation for diabetic ketoacidosis or other metabolic acidosis, pneumonia, pleural effusion, carbon monoxide poisoning, pulmonary embolism, asthma, COPD, laryngospasm, allergic reaction causing airway edema, foreign body aspiration, tracheobronchomalacia, congestive heart failure, anxiety states, haemorrhage, or many other medical issues.

== Etymology and pronunciation ==
The word tachypnea (/ˌtækɪpˈniːə/) uses combining forms of tachy- + -pnea, yielding "fast breathing". See pronunciation information at dyspnea.

== See also ==
- Control of respiration
- Hypoventilation
- List of terms of lung size and activity
- Bradypnea
