= Respiratory system =

Biological system in animals and plants for gas exchange

- A complete, schematic view of the human respiratory system with their parts and functions

Details

Identifiers
- Latin: systema respiratorium
- MeSH: D012137
- TA98: A06.0.00.000
- TA2: 3133
- FMA: 7158

The respiratory system (also respiratory apparatus, ventilatory system) is a biological system consisting of specific organs and structures used for gas exchange in animals and plants.

In land animals, the respiratory surface is internalized as linings of the lungs. Gas exchange in the lungs occurs in millions of small air sacs. In mammals and reptiles, these are called alveoli, and in birds, they are known as atria. These microscopic air sacs have a rich blood supply, bringing the air into close contact with the blood. A system of airways, or hollow tubes, allow the air sacs to interface with the external environment; the largest of these is the trachea, which branches in the middle of the chest into the two main bronchi, which enter the lungs and branch into progressively narrower secondary and tertiary bronchi, which in turn branch into numerous smaller tubes known as the bronchioles in mammals and reptiles. In birds, the bronchioles are termed parabronchi. The bronchioles, or parabronchi, generally open into the microscopic alveoli (in mammals) and atria (in birds). Air has to be pumped from the environment into the alveoli or atria by the process of breathing which involves the muscles of respiration.

In most fish, and a number of other aquatic animals (both vertebrates and invertebrates), the respiratory system consists of gills, which are either partially or completely external organs, bathed in the watery environment. This water flows over the gills by a variety of active or passive means. Gas exchange takes place in the gills which consist of thin or very flat filaments and lammellae which expose a very large surface area of highly vascularized tissue to the water.

Other animals, such as insects, have respiratory systems with very simple anatomical features, and in amphibians, even the skin plays a vital role in gas exchange. Plants also have respiratory systems but the directionality of gas exchange can be opposite to that in animals. The respiratory system in plants includes anatomical features such as stomata, that are found in various parts of the plant.

== Mammals ==
=== Anatomy ===
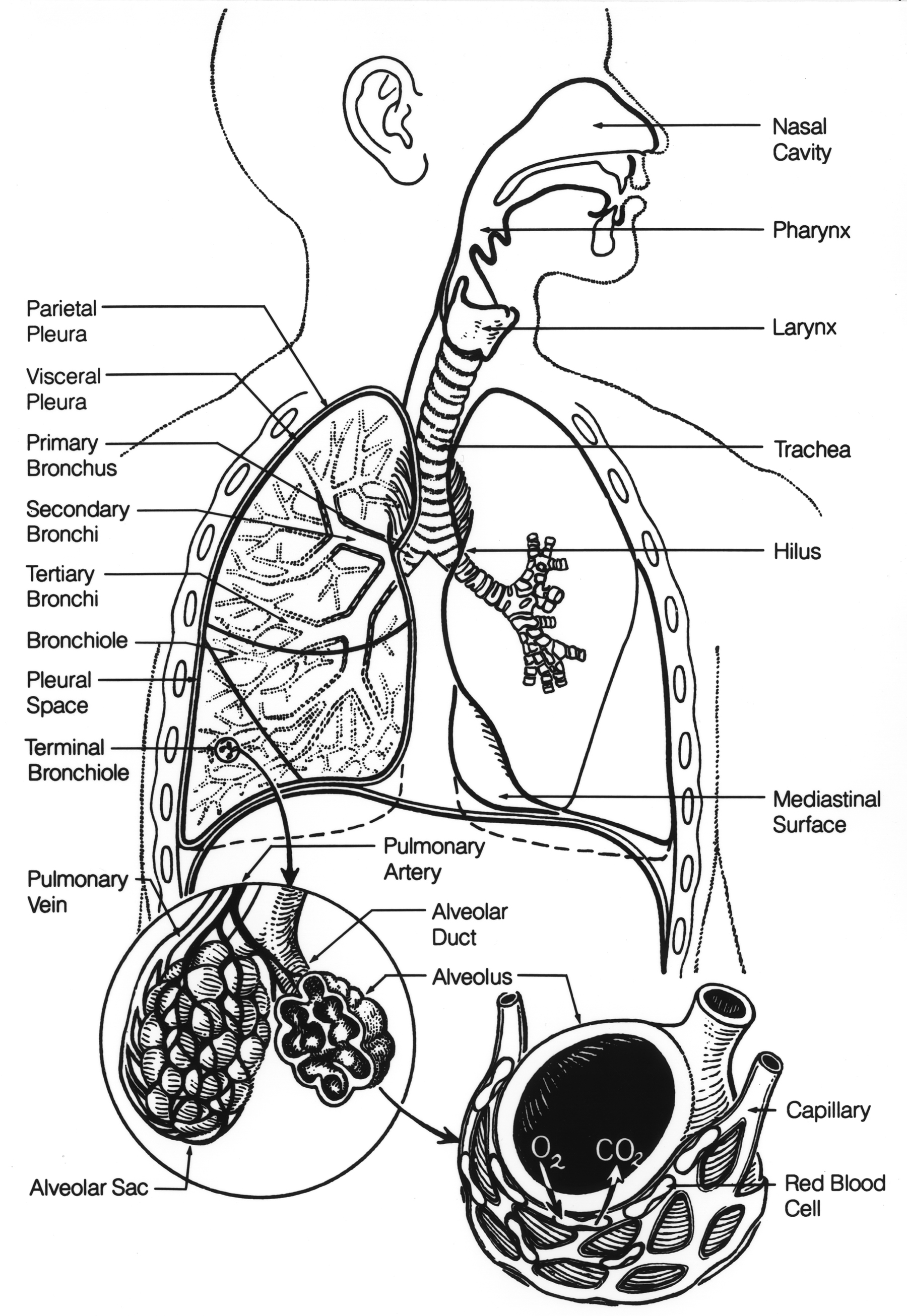
Fig. 1. Respiratory system

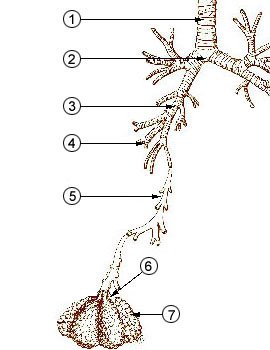
Fig. 2. The lower respiratory tract, or "Respiratory Tree": 1. Trachea; 2. Mainstem bronchus; 3. Lobar bronchus; 4. Segmental bronchus; 5. Bronchiole; 6. Alveolar duct; 7. Alveolus

In humans and other mammals, the anatomy of a typical respiratory system is the respiratory tract. The tract is divided into an upper and a lower respiratory tract. The upper tract includes the nose, nasal cavities, sinuses, pharynx and the part of the larynx above the vocal folds. The lower tract (Fig. 2.) includes the lower part of the larynx, the trachea, bronchi, bronchioles and the alveoli.

The branching airways of the lower tract are often described as the respiratory tree or tracheobronchial tree (Fig. 2). The intervals between successive branch points along the various branches of "tree" are often referred to as branching "generations", of which there are, in the adult human, about 23. The earlier generations (approximately generations 0–16), consisting of the trachea and the bronchi, as well as the larger bronchioles which simply act as air conduits, bringing air to the respiratory bronchioles, alveolar ducts and alveoli (approximately generations 17–23), where gas exchange takes place. Bronchioles are defined as the small airways lacking any cartilaginous support.

The first bronchi to branch from the trachea are the right and left main bronchi. Second, only in diameter to the trachea (1.8 cm), these bronchi (1–1.4 cm in diameter) enter the lungs at each hilum, where they branch into narrower secondary bronchi known as lobar bronchi, and these branch into narrower tertiary bronchi known as segmental bronchi. Further divisions of the segmental bronchi (1 to 6 mm in diameter) are known as 4th order, 5th order, and 6th order segmental bronchi, or grouped together as subsegmental bronchi.

Compared to the 23 number (on average) of branchings of the respiratory tree in the adult human, the mouse has only about 13 such branchings.

The alveoli are the dead end terminals of the "tree", meaning that any air that enters them has to exit via the same route. A system such as this creates dead space, a volume of air (about 150 ml in the adult human) that fills the airways after exhalation and is breathed back into the alveoli before environmental air reaches them. At the end of inhalation, the airways are filled with environmental air, which is exhaled without coming in contact with the gas exchanger.

=== Ventilatory volumes ===
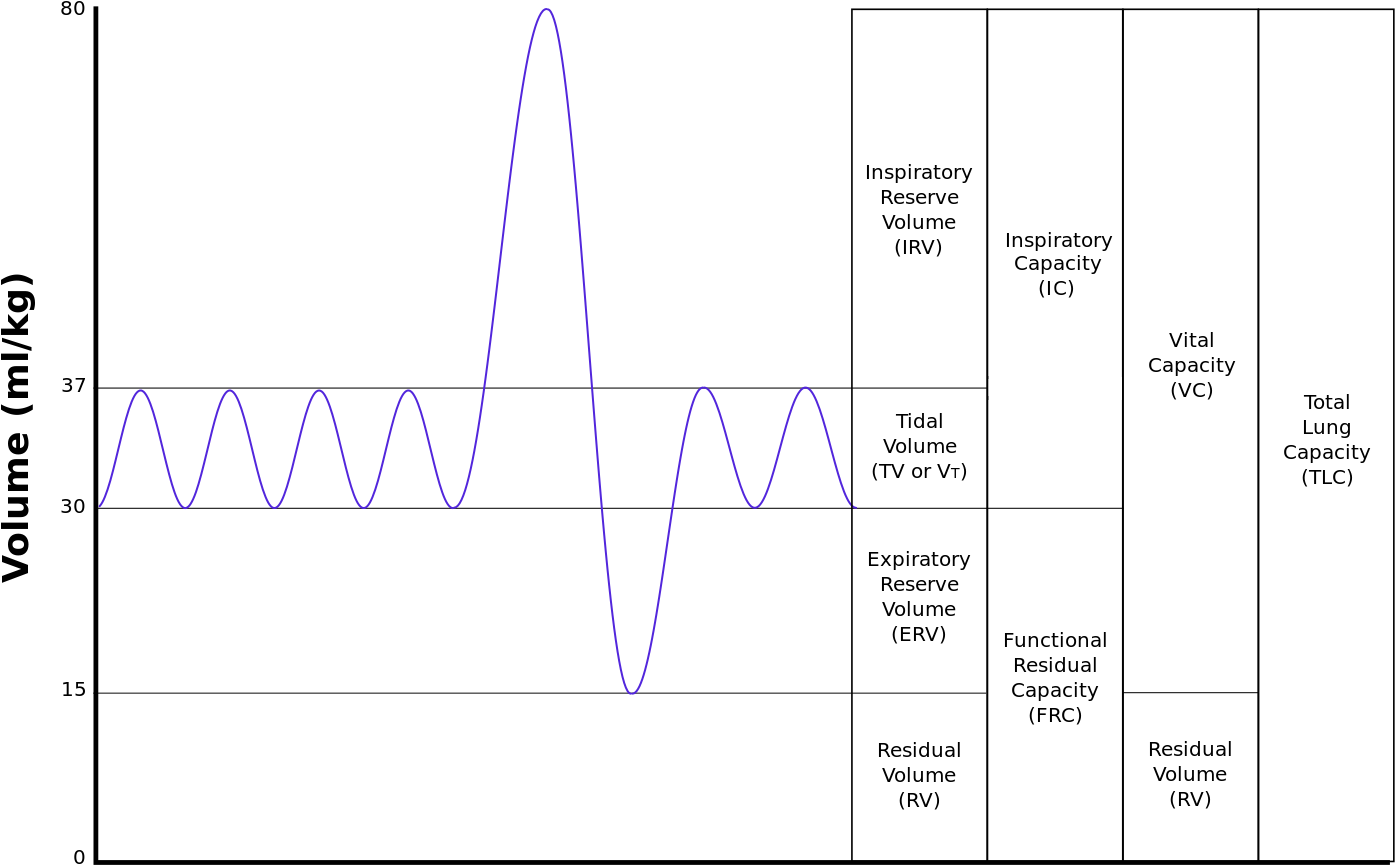
Fig. 3 Output of a 'spirometer'. Upward movement of the graph, read from the left, indicates the intake of air; downward movements represent exhalation.

The lungs expand and contract during the breathing cycle, drawing air in and out of the lungs. The volume of air moved in or out of the lungs under normal resting circumstances (the resting tidal volume of about 500 ml), and volumes moved during maximally forced inhalation and maximally forced exhalation are measured in humans by spirometry. A typical adult human spirogram with the names given to the various excursions in volume the lungs can undergo is illustrated below (Fig. 3):

Not all the air in the lungs can be expelled during maximally forced exhalation (ERV). This is the residual volume (volume of air remaining even after a forced exhalation) of about 1.0–1.5 liters which cannot be measured by spirometry. Volumes that include the residual volume (i.e. functional residual capacity of about 2.5–3.0 liters, and total lung capacity of about 6 liters) can therefore also not be measured by spirometry. Their measurement requires special techniques.

The rates at which air is breathed in or out, either through the mouth or nose or into or out of the alveoli are tabulated below, together with how they are calculated. The number of breath cycles per minute is known as the respiratory rate. An average healthy human breathes 12–16 times a minute.

Measurement	Equation	Description
Minute ventilation	tidal volume * respiratory rate	the total volume of air entering, or leaving, the nose or mouth per minute or normal respiration.
Alveolar ventilation	(tidal volume – dead space) * respiratory rate	the volume of air entering or leaving the alveoli per minute.
Dead space ventilation	dead space * respiratory rate	the volume of air that does not reach the alveoli during inhalation, but instead remains in the airways, per minute.

=== Mechanics of breathing ===
Fig. 6 Real-time magnetic resonance imaging (MRI) of the chest movements of human thorax during breathing

The "pump handle" and "bucket handle movements" of the ribs

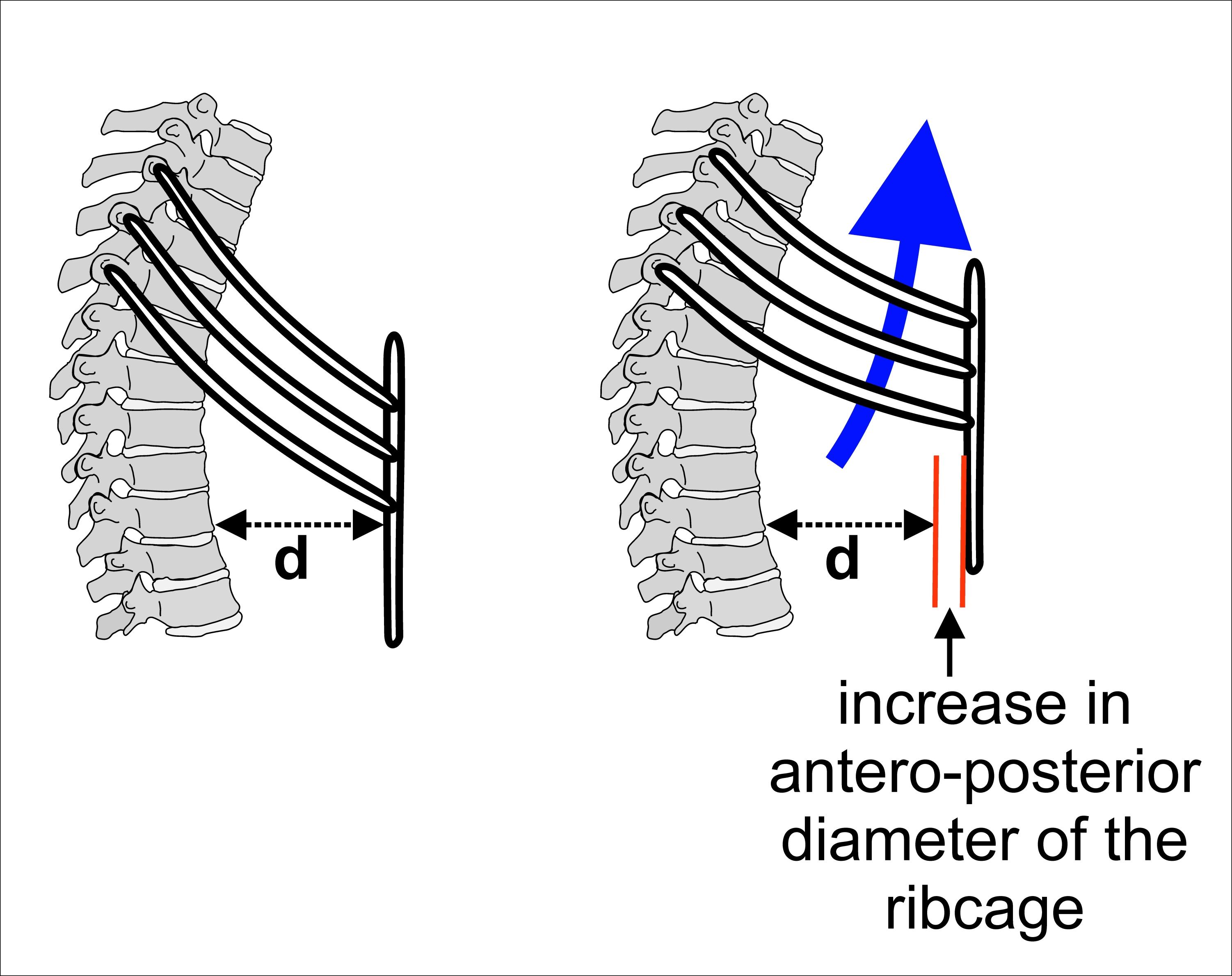
Fig. 4 The effect of the muscles of inhalation in expanding the rib cage. The particular action illustrated here is called the pump handle movement of the rib cage.

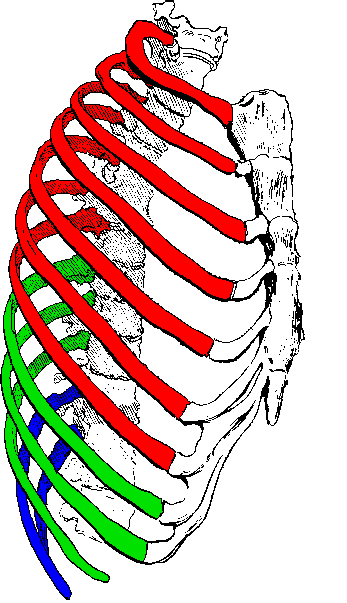
Fig. 5 In this view of the rib cage the downward slope of the lower ribs from the midline outwards can be clearly seen. This allows a movement similar to the "pump handle effect", but in this case, it is called the bucket handle movement. The color of the ribs refers to their classification, and is not relevant here.

Breathing

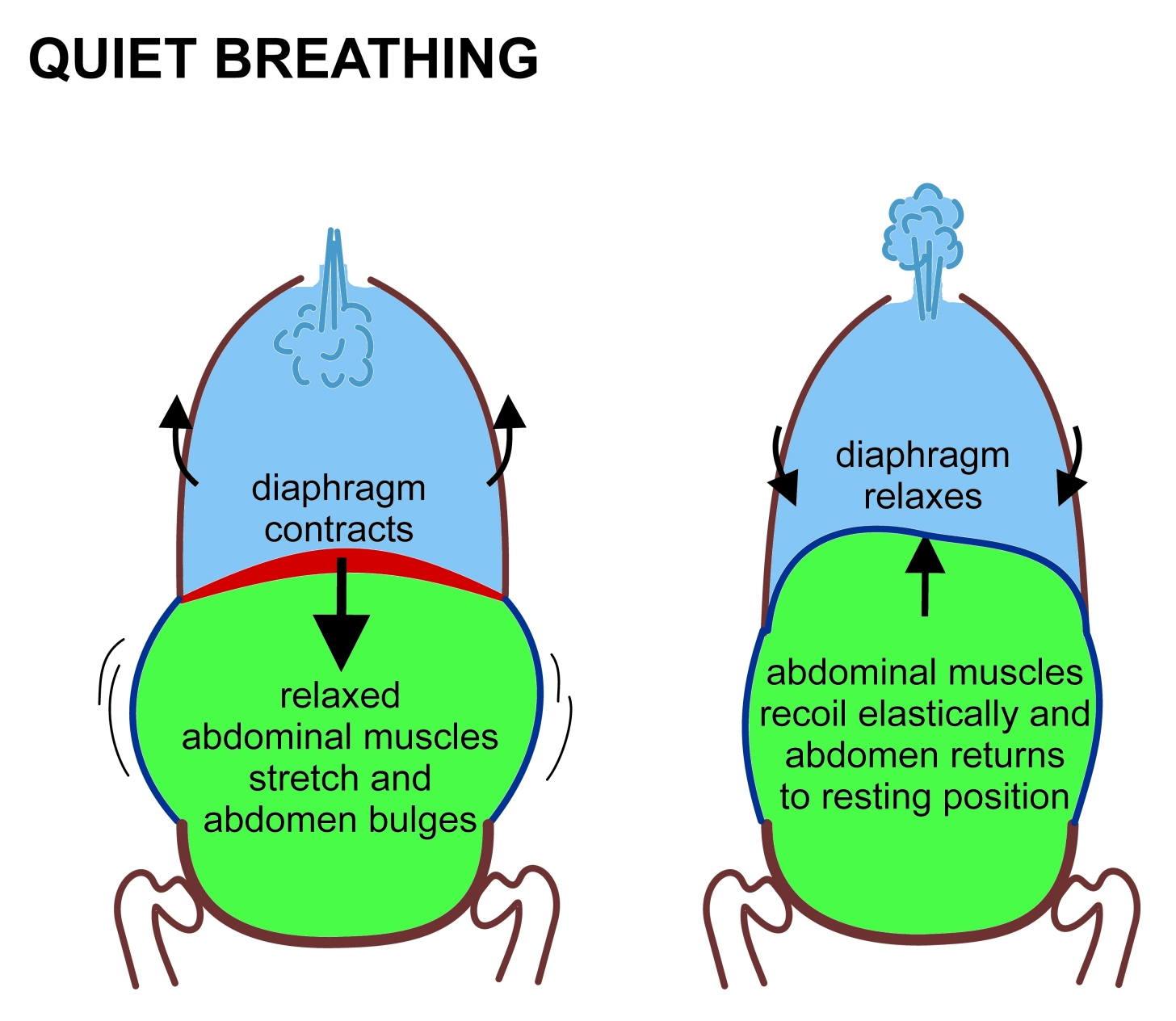
Fig. 7 The muscles of breathing at rest: inhalation on the left, exhalation on the right. Contracting muscles are shown in red; relaxed muscles in blue. Contraction of the diaphragm generally contributes the most to the expansion of the chest cavity (light blue). However, at the same time, the intercostal muscles pull the ribs upwards (their effect is indicated by arrows) also causing the rib cage to expand during inhalation (see diagram on other side of the page). The relaxation of all these muscles during exhalation causes the rib cage and abdomen (light green) to elastically return to their resting positions. Compare with Fig. 6, the MRI video of the chest movements during the breathing cycle.

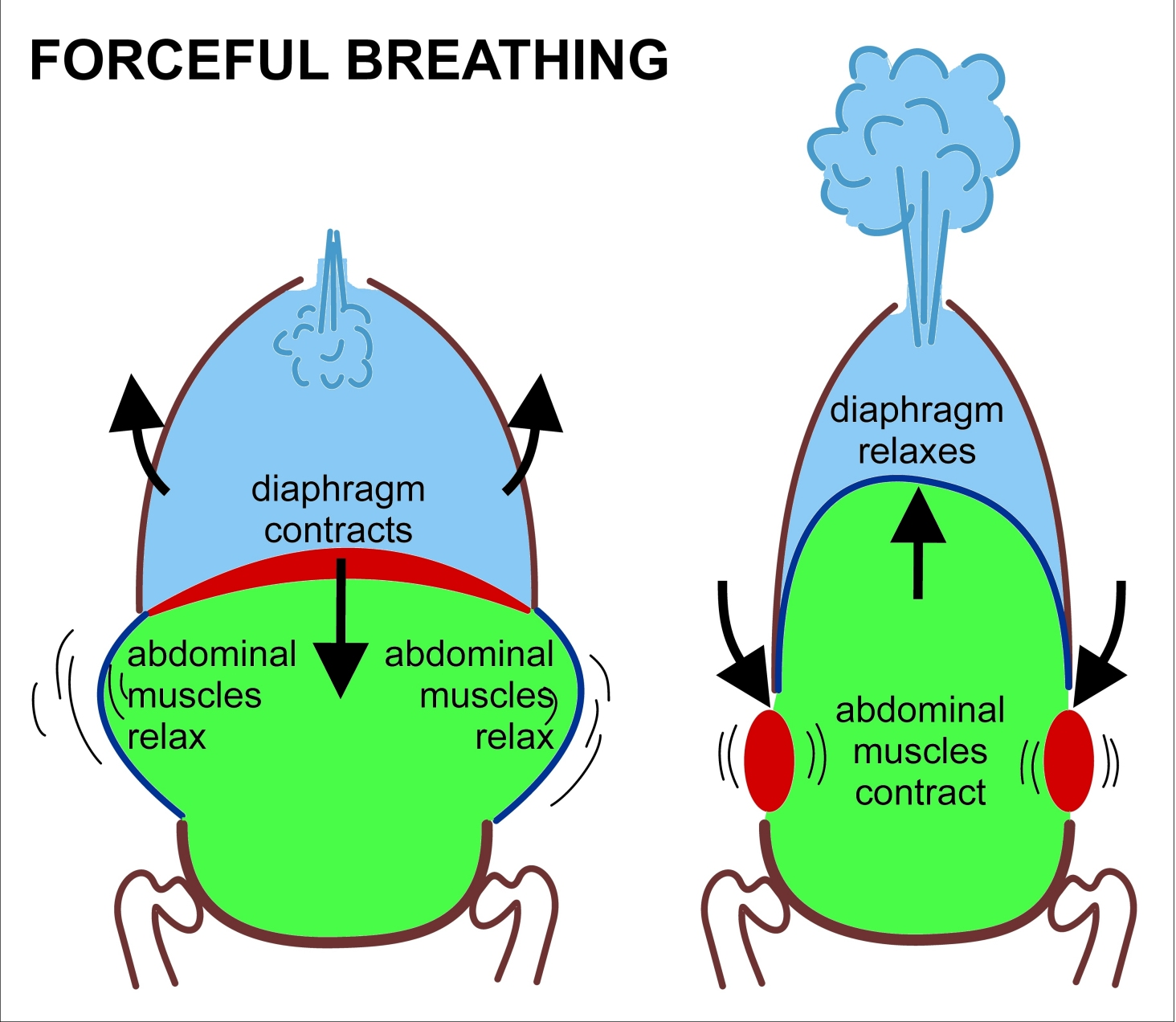
Fig. 8 The muscles of forceful breathing (inhalation and exhalation). The color code is the same as on the left. In addition to a more forceful and extensive contraction of the diaphragm, the intercostal muscles are aided by the accessory muscles of inhalation to exaggerate the movement of the ribs upwards, causing a greater expansion of the rib cage. During exhalation, apart from the relaxation of the muscles of inhalation, the abdominal muscles actively contract to pull the lower edges of the rib cage downwards decreasing the volume of the rib cage, while at the same time pushing the diaphragm upwards deep into the thorax.

In mammals, inhalation at rest is primarily due to the contraction of the diaphragm. This is an upwardly domed sheet of muscle that separates the thoracic cavity from the abdominal cavity. When it contracts, the sheet flattens, (i.e. moves downwards as shown in Fig. 7) increasing the volume of the thoracic cavity in the antero-posterior axis. The contracting diaphragm pushes the abdominal organs downwards. But because the pelvic floor prevents the lowermost abdominal organs from moving in that direction, the pliable abdominal contents cause the belly to bulge outwards to the front and sides, because the relaxed abdominal muscles do not resist this movement (Fig. 7). This entirely passive bulging (and shrinking during exhalation) of the abdomen during normal breathing is sometimes referred to as "abdominal breathing", although it is, in fact, "diaphragmatic breathing", which is not visible on the outside of the body. Mammals only use their abdominal muscles during forceful exhalation (see Fig. 8, and discussion below) and never during any form of inhalation.

As the diaphragm contracts, the rib cage is simultaneously enlarged by the ribs being pulled upwards by the intercostal muscles as shown in Fig. 4. All the ribs slant downwards from the rear to the front (as shown in Fig. 4); but the lowermost ribs also slant downwards from the midline outwards (Fig. 5). Thus the rib cage's transverse diameter can be increased in the same way as the antero-posterior diameter is increased by the so-called pump handle movement shown in Fig. 4.

The enlargement of the thoracic cavity's vertical dimension by the contraction of the diaphragm, and its two horizontal dimensions by the lifting of the front and sides of the ribs, causes the intrathoracic pressure to fall. The lungs' interiors are open to the outside air and being elastic, therefore expand to fill the increased space, pleura fluid between double-layered pleura covering of lungs helps in reducing friction while lungs expand and contract. The inflow of air into the lungs occurs via the respiratory airways (Fig. 2). In a healthy person, these airways begin with the nose. (It is possible to begin with the mouth, which is the backup breathing system. However, chronic mouth breathing leads to, or is a sign of, illness.) It ends in the microscopic dead-end sacs called alveoli, which are always open, though the diameters of the various sections can be changed by the sympathetic and parasympathetic nervous systems. The alveolar air pressure is therefore always close to atmospheric air pressure (about 100 kPa at sea level) at rest, with the pressure gradients because of lungs contraction and expansion cause air to move in and out of the lungs during breathing rarely exceeding 2–3 kPa.

During exhalation, the diaphragm and intercostal muscles relax. This returns the chest and abdomen to a position determined by their anatomical elasticity. This is the "resting mid-position" of the thorax and abdomen (Fig. 7) when the lungs contain their functional residual capacity of air (the light blue area in the right hand illustration of Fig. 7), which in the adult human has a volume of about 2.5–3.0 liters (Fig. 3). Resting exhalation lasts about twice as long as inhalation because the diaphragm relaxes passively more gently than it contracts actively during inhalation.

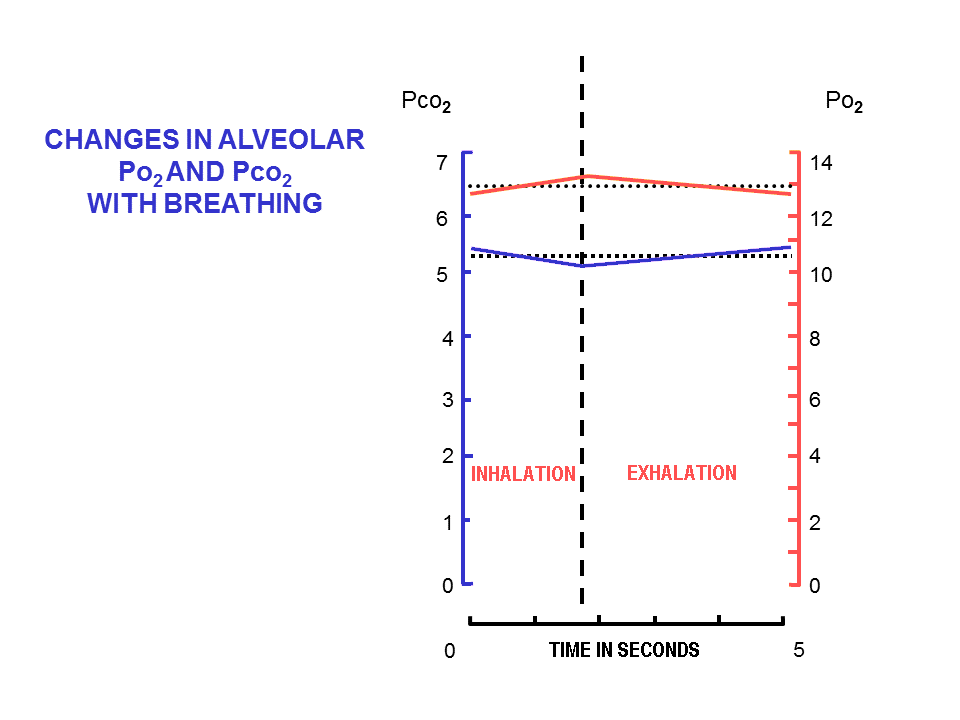
Fig. 9 The changes in the composition of the alveolar air during a normal breathing cycle at rest. The scale on the left, and the blue line, indicate the partial pressures of carbon dioxide in kPa, while that on the right and the red line, indicate the partial pressures of oxygen, also in kPa (to convert kPa into mm Hg, multiply by 7.5).

The volume of air that moves in or out (at the nose or mouth) during a single breathing cycle is called the tidal volume. In a resting adult human, it is about 500 ml per breath. At the end of exhalation, the airways contain about 150 ml of alveolar air which is the first air that is breathed back into the alveoli during inhalation. This volume air that is breathed out of the alveoli and back in again is known as dead space ventilation, which has the consequence that of the 500 ml breathed into the alveoli with each breath only 350 ml (500 ml – 150 ml = 350 ml) is fresh warm and moistened air. Since this 350 ml of fresh air is thoroughly mixed and diluted by the air that remains in the alveoli after a normal exhalation (i.e. the functional residual capacity of about 2.5–3.0 liters), it is clear that the composition of the alveolar air changes very little during the breathing cycle (see Fig. 9). The oxygen tension (or partial pressure) remains close to 13–14 kPa (about 100 mm Hg), and that of carbon dioxide very close to 5.3 kPa (or 40 mm Hg). This contrasts with composition of the dry outside air at sea level, where the partial pressure of oxygen is 21 kPa (or 160 mm Hg) and that of carbon dioxide 0.04 kPa (or 0.3 mmHg).

During heavy breathing (hyperpnea), as, for instance, during exercise, inhalation is brought about by a more powerful and greater excursion of the contracting diaphragm than at rest (Fig. 8). In addition, the "accessory muscles of inhalation" exaggerate the actions of the intercostal muscles (Fig. 8). These accessory muscles of inhalation are muscles that extend from the cervical vertebrae and base of the skull to the upper ribs and sternum, sometimes through an intermediary attachment to the clavicles. When they contract, the rib cage's internal volume is increased to a far greater extent than can be achieved by contraction of the intercostal muscles alone. Seen from outside the body, the lifting of the clavicles during strenuous or labored inhalation is sometimes called clavicular breathing, seen especially during asthma attacks and in people with chronic obstructive pulmonary disease.

During heavy breathing, exhalation is caused by relaxation of all the muscles of inhalation. But now, the abdominal muscles, instead of remaining relaxed (as they do at rest), contract forcibly pulling the lower edges of the rib cage downwards (front and sides) (Fig. 8). This not only drastically decreases the size of the rib cage, but also pushes the abdominal organs upwards against the diaphragm which consequently bulges deeply into the thorax (Fig. 8). The end-exhalatory lung volume is now well below the resting mid-position and contains far less air than the resting "functional residual capacity". However, in a normal mammal, the lungs cannot be emptied completely. In an adult human, there is always still at least 1 liter of residual air left in the lungs after maximum exhalation.

The automatic rhythmical breathing in and out, can be interrupted by coughing, sneezing (forms of very forceful exhalation), by the expression of a wide range of emotions (laughing, sighing, crying out in pain, exasperated intakes of breath) and by such voluntary acts as speech, singing, whistling and the playing of wind instruments. All of these actions rely on the muscles described above, and their effects on the movement of air in and out of the lungs.

Although not a form of breathing, the Valsalva maneuver involves the respiratory muscles. It is, in fact, a very forceful exhalatory effort against a tightly closed glottis, so that no air can escape from the lungs. Instead, abdominal contents are evacuated in the opposite direction, through orifices in the pelvic floor. The abdominal muscles contract very powerfully, causing the pressure inside the abdomen and thorax to rise to extremely high levels. The Valsalva maneuver can be carried out voluntarily but is more generally a reflex elicited when attempting to empty the abdomen during, for instance, difficult defecation, or during childbirth. Breathing ceases during this maneuver.

=== Gas exchange ===
Mechanism of gas exchange

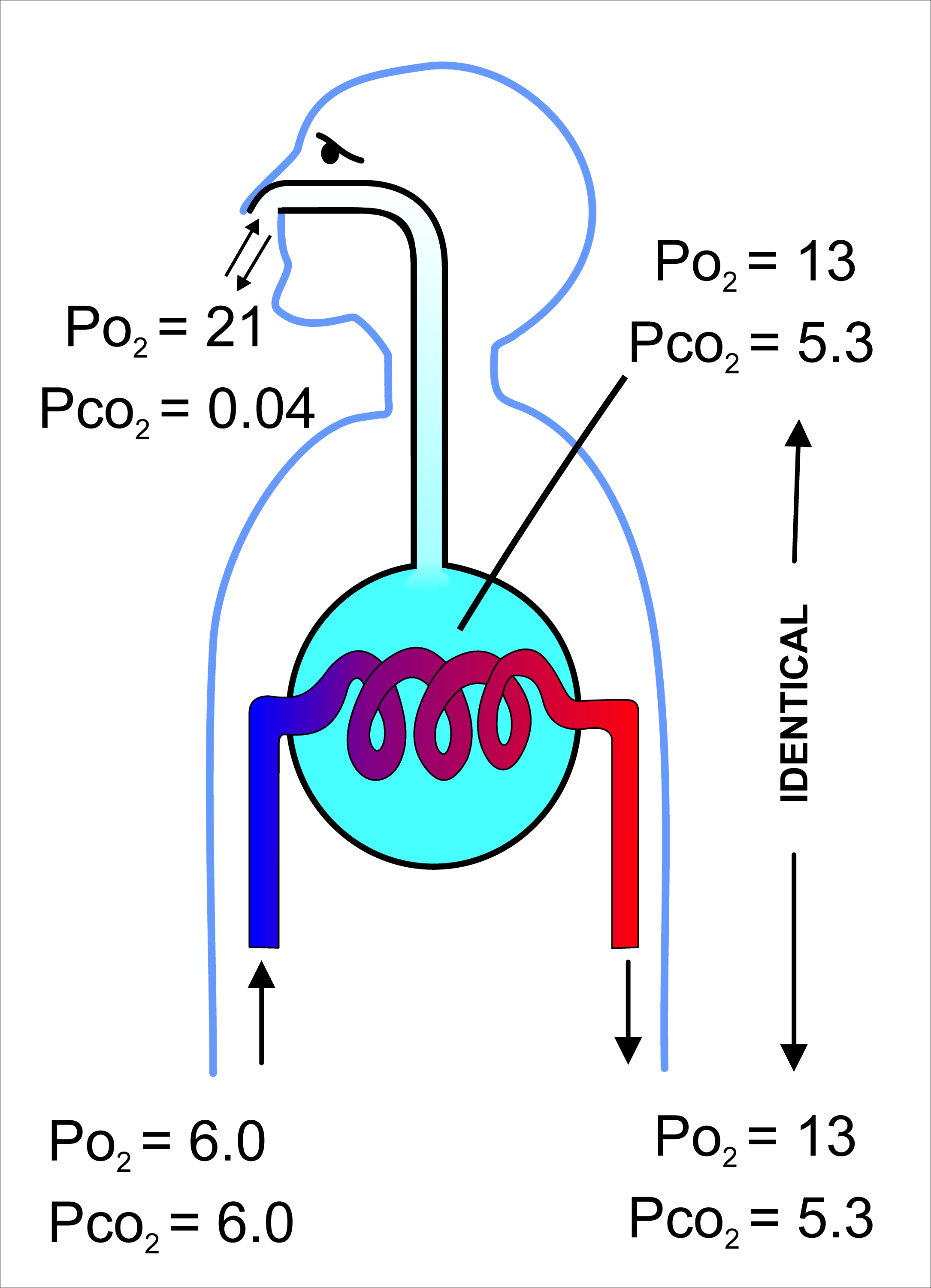
Fig. 11 A highly diagrammatic illustration of the process of gas exchange in the mammalian lungs, emphasizing the differences between the gas compositions of the ambient air, the alveolar air (light blue) with which the pulmonary capillary blood equilibrates, and the blood gas tensions in the pulmonary arterial (blue blood entering the lung on the left) and venous blood (red blood leaving the lung on the right). All the gas tensions are in kPa. To convert to mm Hg, multiply by 7.5.

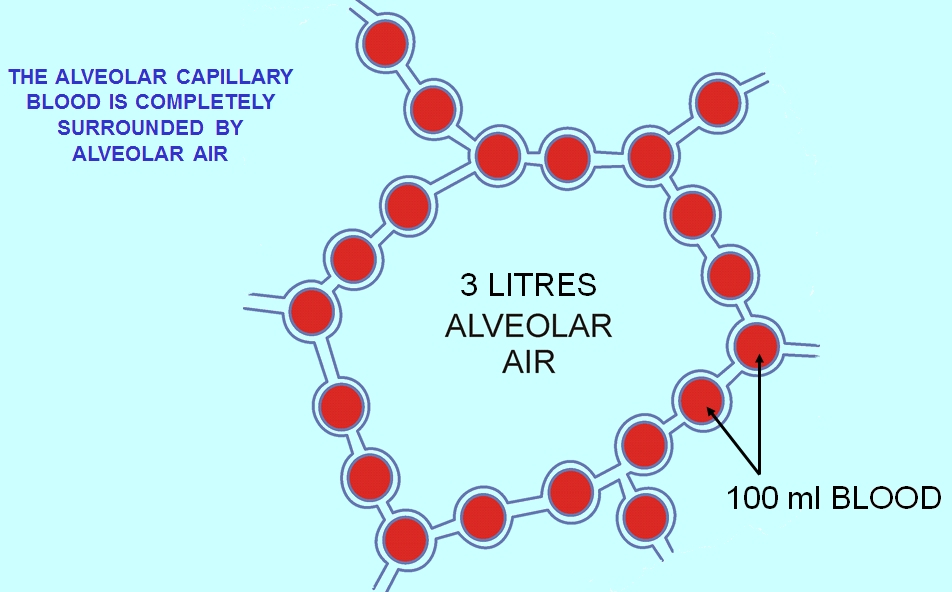
Fig. 12 A diagrammatic histological cross-section through a portion of lung tissue showing a normally inflated alveolus (at the end of a normal exhalation), and its walls containing the pulmonary capillaries (shown in cross-section). This illustrates how the pulmonary capillary blood is completely surrounded by alveolar air. In a normal human lung, all the alveoli together contain about 3 liters of alveolar air. All the pulmonary capillaries contain about 100 ml of blood.

Fig. 10 A histological cross-section through an alveolar wall showing the layers through which the gases have to move between the blood plasma and the alveolar air. The dark blue objects are the nuclei of the capillary endothelial and alveolar type I epithelial cells (or type 1 pneumocytes). The two red objects labeled "RBC" are red blood cells in the pulmonary capillary blood.

The primary purpose of the respiratory system is the equalizing of the partial pressures of the respiratory gases in the alveolar air with those in the pulmonary capillary blood (Fig. 11). This process occurs by simple diffusion, across a very thin membrane (known as the blood–air barrier), which forms the walls of the pulmonary alveoli (Fig. 10). It consists of the alveolar epithelial cells, their basement membranes and the endothelial cells of the alveolar capillaries (Fig. 10). This blood gas barrier is extremely thin (in humans, on average, 2.2 μm thick). It is folded into about 300 million small air sacs called alveoli (each between 75 and 300 μm in diameter) branching off from the respiratory bronchioles in the lungs, thus providing an extremely large surface area (approximately 145 m^{2}) for gas exchange to occur.

The air contained within the alveoli has a semi-permanent volume of about 2.5–3.0 liters which completely surrounds the alveolar capillary blood (Fig. 12). This ensures that equilibration of the partial pressures of the gases in the two compartments is very efficient and occurs very quickly. The blood leaving the alveolar capillaries and is eventually distributed throughout the body therefore has a partial pressure of oxygen of 13–14 kPa (100 mmHg), and a partial pressure of carbon dioxide of 5.3 kPa (40 mmHg) (i.e. the same as the oxygen and carbon dioxide gas tensions as in the alveoli). As mentioned in the section above, the corresponding partial pressures of oxygen and carbon dioxide in the ambient (dry) air at sea level are 21 kPa (160 mmHg) and 0.04 kPa (0.3 mmHg) respectively.

This marked difference between the composition of the alveolar air and that of the ambient air can be maintained because the functional residual capacity is contained in dead-end sacs connected to the outside air by fairly narrow and relatively long tubes (the airways: nose, pharynx, larynx, trachea, bronchi and their branches down to the bronchioles), through which the air has to be breathed both in and out (i.e. there is no unidirectional through-flow as there is in the bird lung). This typical mammalian anatomy combined with the fact that the lungs are not emptied and re-inflated with each breath (leaving a substantial volume of air, of about 2.5–3.0 liters, in the alveoli after exhalation), ensures that the composition of the alveolar air is only minimally disturbed when the 350 ml of fresh air is mixed into it with each inhalation. Thus the animal is provided with a very special "portable atmosphere", whose composition differs significantly from the present-day ambient air. It is this portable atmosphere (the functional residual capacity) to which the blood and therefore the body tissues are exposed – not to the outside air.

The resulting arterial partial pressures of oxygen and carbon dioxide are homeostatically controlled. A rise in the arterial partial pressure of CO_{2} and, to a lesser extent, a fall in the arterial partial pressure of O_{2}, will reflexly cause deeper and faster breathing until the blood gas tensions in the lungs, and therefore the arterial blood, return to normal. The converse happens when the carbon dioxide tension falls, or, again to a lesser extent, the oxygen tension rises: the rate and depth of breathing are reduced until blood gas normality is restored.

Since the blood arriving in the alveolar capillaries has a partial pressure of O_{2} of, on average, 6 kPa (45 mmHg), while the pressure in the alveolar air is 13–14 kPa (100 mmHg), there will be a net diffusion of oxygen into the capillary blood, changing the composition of the 3 liters of alveolar air slightly. Similarly, since the blood arriving in the alveolar capillaries has a partial pressure of CO_{2} of also about 6 kPa (45 mmHg), whereas that of the alveolar air is 5.3 kPa (40 mmHg), there is a net movement of carbon dioxide out of the capillaries into the alveoli. The changes brought about by these net flows of individual gases into and out of the alveolar air necessitate the replacement of about 15% of the alveolar air with ambient air every 5 seconds or so. This is very tightly controlled by the monitoring of the arterial blood gases (which accurately reflect composition of the alveolar air) by the aortic and carotid bodies, as well as by the blood gas and pH sensor on the anterior surface of the medulla oblongata in the brain. There are also oxygen and carbon dioxide sensors in the lungs, but they primarily determine the diameters of the bronchioles and pulmonary capillaries, and are therefore responsible for directing the flow of air and blood to different parts of the lungs.

It is only as a result of accurately maintaining the composition of the 3 liters of alveolar air that with each breath some carbon dioxide is discharged into the atmosphere and some oxygen is taken up from the outside air. If more carbon dioxide than usual has been lost by a short period of hyperventilation, respiration will be slowed down or halted until the alveolar partial pressure of carbon dioxide has returned to 5.3 kPa (40 mmHg). It is therefore strictly speaking untrue that the primary function of the respiratory system is to rid the body of carbon dioxide "waste". The carbon dioxide that is breathed out with each breath could probably be more correctly be seen as a byproduct of the body's extracellular fluid carbon dioxide and pH homeostats.

If these homeostats are compromised, then a respiratory acidosis, or a respiratory alkalosis will occur. In the long run these can be compensated by renal adjustments to the H^{+} and HCO_{3}^{−} concentrations in the plasma; but since this takes time, the hyperventilation syndrome can, for instance, occur when agitation or anxiety cause a person to breathe fast and deeply thus causing a distressing respiratory alkalosis through the blowing off of too much CO_{2} from the blood into the outside air.

Oxygen has a very low solubility in water, and is therefore carried in the blood loosely combined with hemoglobin. The oxygen is held on the hemoglobin by four ferrous iron-containing heme groups per hemoglobin molecule. When all the heme groups carry one O_{2} molecule each the blood is said to be "saturated" with oxygen, and no further increase in the partial pressure of oxygen will meaningfully increase the oxygen concentration of the blood. Most of the carbon dioxide in the blood is carried as bicarbonate ions (HCO_{3}^{−}) in the plasma. However the conversion of dissolved CO_{2} into HCO_{3}^{−} (through the addition of water) is too slow for the rate at which the blood circulates through the tissues on the one hand, and through alveolar capillaries on the other. The reaction is therefore catalyzed by carbonic anhydrase, an enzyme inside the red blood cells. The reaction can go in both directions depending on the prevailing partial pressure of CO_{2}. A small amount of carbon dioxide is carried on the protein portion of the hemoglobin molecules as carbamino groups. The total concentration of carbon dioxide (in the form of bicarbonate ions, dissolved CO_{2}, and carbamino groups) in arterial blood (i.e. after it has equilibrated with the alveolar air) is about 26 mM (or 58 ml/100 ml), compared to the concentration of oxygen in saturated arterial blood of about 9 mM (or 20 ml/100 ml blood).

=== Control of ventilation ===
Ventilation of the lungs in mammals occurs via the respiratory centers in the medulla oblongata and the pons of the brainstem. These areas form a series of neural pathways which receive information about the partial pressures of oxygen and carbon dioxide in the arterial blood. This information determines the average rate of ventilation of the alveoli of the lungs, to keep these pressures constant. The respiratory center does so via motor nerves which activate the diaphragm and other muscles of respiration.

The breathing rate increases when the partial pressure of carbon dioxide in the blood increases. This is detected by central blood gas chemoreceptors on the anterior surface of the medulla oblongata. The aortic and carotid bodies, are the peripheral blood gas chemoreceptors which are particularly sensitive to the arterial partial pressure of O_{2} though they also respond, but less strongly, to the partial pressure of CO_{2}. At sea level, under normal circumstances, the breathing rate and depth, is determined primarily by the arterial partial pressure of carbon dioxide rather than by the arterial partial pressure of oxygen, which is allowed to vary within a fairly wide range before the respiratory centers in the medulla oblongata and pons respond to it to change the rate and depth of breathing.

Exercise increases the breathing rate due to the extra carbon dioxide produced by the enhanced metabolism of the exercising muscles. In addition, passive movements of the limbs also reflexively produce an increase in the breathing rate.

Information received from stretch receptors in the lungs' limits tidal volume (the depth of inhalation and exhalation).

=== Responses to low atmospheric pressures ===
The alveoli are open (via the airways) to the atmosphere, with the result that alveolar air pressure is exactly the same as the ambient air pressure at sea level, at altitude, or in any artificial atmosphere (e.g. a diving chamber, or decompression chamber) in which the individual is breathing freely. With expansion of the lungs the alveolar air occupies a larger volume, and its pressure falls proportionally, causing air to flow in through the airways, until the pressure in the alveoli is again at the ambient air pressure. The reverse happens during exhalation. This process (of inhalation and exhalation) is exactly the same at sea level, as on top of Mt. Everest, or in a diving chamber or decompression chamber.

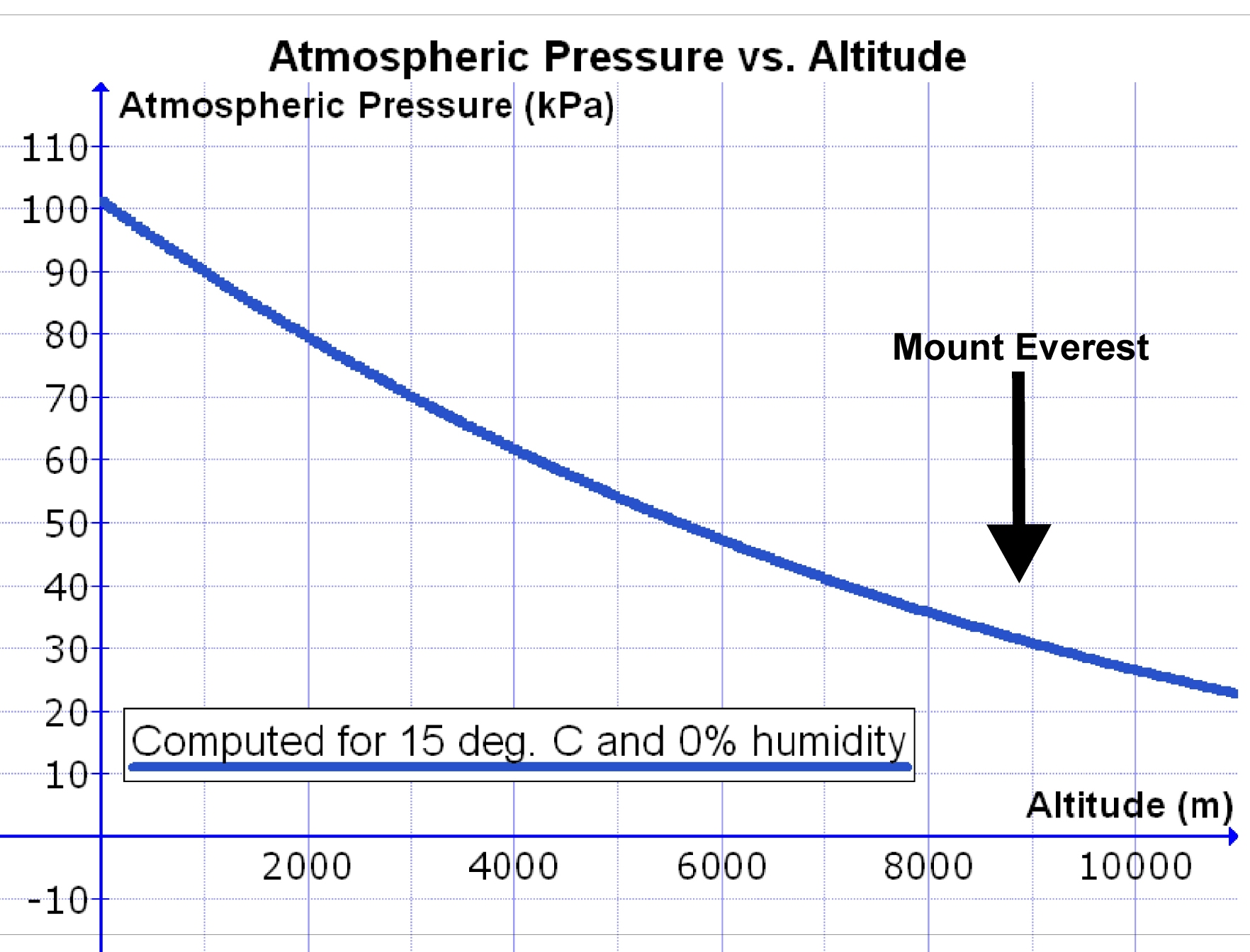
Fig. 14 A graph showing the relationship between total atmospheric pressure and altitude above sea level

However, as one rises above sea level the density of the air decreases exponentially (see Fig. 14), halving approximately with every 5500 m rise in altitude. Since the composition of the atmospheric air is almost constant below 80 km, as a result of the continuous mixing effect of the weather, the concentration of oxygen in the air (mmols O_{2} per liter of ambient air) decreases at the same rate as the fall in air pressure with altitude. Therefore, in order to breathe in the same amount of oxygen per minute, the person has to inhale a proportionately greater volume of air per minute at altitude than at sea level. This is achieved by breathing deeper and faster (i.e. hyperpnea) than at sea level (see below).

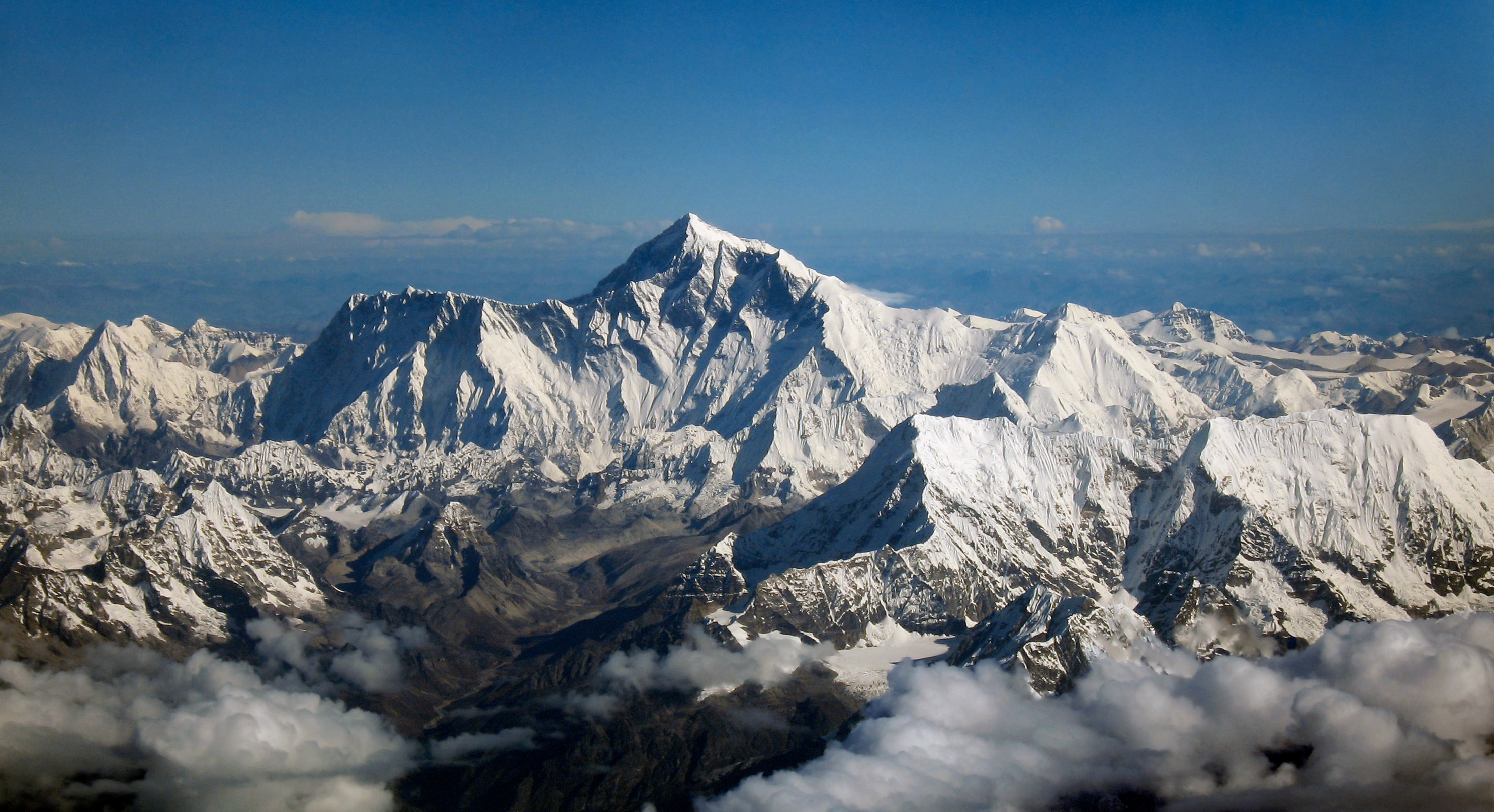
Fig. 13 Aerial photo of Mount Everest from the south, behind Nuptse and Lhotse

There is, however, a complication that increases the volume of air that needs to be inhaled per minute (respiratory minute volume) to provide the same amount of oxygen to the lungs at altitude as at sea level. During inhalation, the air is warmed and saturated with water vapor during its passage through the nose passages and pharynx. Saturated water vapor pressure is dependent only on temperature. At a body core temperature of 37 °C it is 6.3 kPa (47.0 mmHg), irrespective of any other influences, including altitude. Thus at sea level, where the ambient atmospheric pressure is about 100 kPa, the moistened air that flows into the lungs from the trachea consists of water vapor (6.3 kPa), nitrogen (74.0 kPa), oxygen (19.7 kPa) and trace amounts of carbon dioxide and other gases (a total of 100 kPa). In dry air the partial pressure of O_{2} at sea level is 21.0 kPa (i.e. 21% of 100 kPa), compared to the 19.7 kPa of oxygen entering the alveolar air. (The tracheal partial pressure of oxygen is 21% of [100 kPa – 6.3 kPa] = 19.7 kPa). At the summit of Mt. Everest (at an altitude of 8,848 m or 29,029 ft), the total atmospheric pressure is 33.7 kPa, of which 7.1 kPa (or 21%) is oxygen. The air entering the lungs also has a total pressure of 33.7 kPa, of which 6.3 kPa is, unavoidably, water vapor (as it is at sea level). This reduces the partial pressure of oxygen entering the alveoli to 5.8 kPa (or 21% of [33.7 kPa – 6.3 kPa] = 5.8 kPa). The reduction in the partial pressure of oxygen in the inhaled air is therefore substantially greater than the reduction of the total atmospheric pressure at altitude would suggest (on Mt Everest: 5.8 kPa vs. 7.1 kPa).

A further minor complication exists at altitude. If the volume of the lungs were to be instantaneously doubled at the beginning of inhalation, the air pressure inside the lungs would be halved. This happens regardless of altitude. Thus, halving of the sea level air pressure (100 kPa) results in an intrapulmonary air pressure of 50 kPa. Doing the same at 5500 m, where the atmospheric pressure is only 50 kPa, the intrapulmonary air pressure falls to 25 kPa. Therefore, the same change in lung volume at sea level results in a 50 kPa difference in pressure between the ambient air and the intrapulmonary air, whereas it result in a difference of only 25 kPa at 5500 m. The driving pressure forcing air into the lungs during inhalation is therefore halved at this altitude. The rate of inflow of air into the lungs during inhalation at sea level is therefore twice that which occurs at 5500 m. However, in reality, inhalation and exhalation occur far more gently and less abruptly than in the example given. The differences between the atmospheric and intrapulmonary pressures, driving air in and out of the lungs during the breathing cycle, are in the region of only 2–3 kPa. A doubling or more of these small pressure differences could be achieved only by very major changes in the breathing effort at high altitudes.

All of the above influences of low atmospheric pressures on breathing are accommodated primarily by breathing deeper and faster (hyperpnea). The exact degree of hyperpnea is determined by the blood gas homeostat, which regulates the partial pressures of oxygen and carbon dioxide in the arterial blood. This homeostat prioritizes the regulation of the arterial partial pressure of carbon dioxide over that of oxygen at sea level. That is to say, at sea level the arterial partial pressure of CO_{2} is maintained at very close to 5.3 kPa (or 40 mmHg) under a wide range of circumstances, at the expense of the arterial partial pressure of O_{2}, which is allowed to vary within a very wide range of values, before eliciting a corrective ventilatory response. However, when the atmospheric pressure (and therefore the partial pressure of O_{2} in the ambient air) falls to below 50–75% of its value at sea level, oxygen homeostasis is given priority over carbon dioxide homeostasis. This switch-over occurs at an elevation of about 2500 m (or about 8000 ft). If this switch occurs relatively abruptly, the hyperpnea at high altitude will cause a severe fall in the arterial partial pressure of carbon dioxide, with a consequent rise in the pH of the arterial plasma. This is one contributor to high altitude sickness. On the other hand, if the switch to oxygen homeostasis is incomplete, then hypoxia may complicate the clinical picture with potentially fatal results.

There are oxygen sensors in the smaller bronchi and bronchioles. In response to low partial pressures of oxygen in the inhaled air these sensors reflexively cause the pulmonary arterioles to constrict. (This is the exact opposite of the corresponding reflex in the tissues, where low arterial partial pressures of O_{2} cause arteriolar vasodilation.) At altitude this causes the pulmonary arterial pressure to rise resulting in a much more even distribution of blood flow to the lungs than occurs at sea level. At sea level, the pulmonary arterial pressure is very low, with the result that the tops of the lungs receive far less blood than the bases, which are relatively over-perfused with blood. It is only in the middle of the lungs that the blood and air flow to the alveoli are ideally matched. At altitude, this variation in the ventilation/perfusion ratio of alveoli from the tops of the lungs to the bottoms is eliminated, with all the alveoli perfused and ventilated in more or less the physiologically ideal manner. This is a further important contributor to the acclimatatization to high altitudes and low oxygen pressures.

The kidneys measure the oxygen content (mmol O_{2}/liter blood, rather than the partial pressure of O_{2}) of the arterial blood. When the oxygen content of the blood is chronically low, as at high altitude, the oxygen-sensitive kidney cells secrete erythropoietin (EPO) into the blood. This hormone stimulates the red bone marrow to increase its rate of red cell production, which leads to an increase in the hematocrit of the blood, and a consequent increase in its oxygen carrying capacity (due to the now high hemoglobin content of the blood). In other words, at the same arterial partial pressure of O_{2}, a person with a high hematocrit carries more oxygen per liter of blood than a person with a lower hematocrit does. High altitude dwellers therefore have higher hematocrits than sea-level residents.

=== Other functions of the lungs ===
==== Local defenses ====
Irritation of nerve endings within the nasal passages or airways, can induce a cough reflex and sneezing. These responses cause air to be expelled forcefully from the trachea or nose, respectively. In this manner, irritants caught in the mucus which lines the respiratory tract are expelled or moved to the mouth where they can be swallowed. During coughing, contraction of the smooth muscle in the airway walls narrows the trachea by pulling the ends of the cartilage plates together and by pushing soft tissue into the lumen. This increases the expired airflow rate to dislodge and remove any irritant particle or mucus.

Respiratory epithelium can secrete a variety of molecules that aid in the defense of the lungs. These include secretory immunoglobulins (IgA), collectins, defensins and other peptides and proteases, reactive oxygen species, and reactive nitrogen species. These secretions can act directly as antimicrobials to help keep the airway free of infection. A variety of chemokines and cytokines are also secreted that recruit the traditional immune cells and others to the site of infections.

Surfactant immune function is primarily attributed to two proteins: SP-A and SP-D. These proteins can bind to sugars on the surface of pathogens and thereby opsonize them for uptake by phagocytes. It also regulates inflammatory responses and interacts with the adaptive immune response. Surfactant degradation or inactivation may contribute to enhanced susceptibility to lung inflammation and infection.

Most of the respiratory system is lined with mucous membranes that contain mucosa-associated lymphoid tissue, which produces white blood cells such as lymphocytes.

==== Prevention of alveolar collapse ====
The lungs make a surfactant, a surface-active lipoprotein complex (phospholipoprotein) formed by type II alveolar cells. It floats on the surface of the thin watery layer which lines the insides of the alveoli, reducing the water's surface tension.

The surface tension of a watery surface (the water-air interface) tends to make that surface shrink. When that surface is curved as it is in the alveoli of the lungs, the shrinkage of the surface decreases the diameter of the alveoli. The more acute the curvature of the water-air interface the greater the tendency for the alveolus to collapse. This has three effects. Firstly, the surface tension inside the alveoli resists expansion of the alveoli during inhalation (i.e. it makes the lung stiff, or non-compliant). Surfactant reduces the surface tension and therefore makes the lungs more compliant, or less stiff, than if it were not there. Secondly, the diameters of the alveoli increase and decrease during the breathing cycle. This means that the alveoli have a greater tendency to collapse (i.e. cause atelectasis) at the end of exhalation than at the end of inhalation. Since surfactant floats on the watery surface, its molecules are more tightly packed together when the alveoli shrink during exhalation. This causes them to have a greater surface tension-lowering effect when the alveoli are small than when they are large (as at the end of inhalation, when the surfactant molecules are more widely spaced). The tendency for the alveoli to collapse is therefore almost the same at the end of exhalation as at the end of inhalation. Thirdly, the surface tension of the curved watery layer lining the alveoli tends to draw water from the lung tissues into the alveoli. Surfactant reduces this danger to negligible levels, and keeps the alveoli dry.

Pre-term babies who are unable to manufacture surfactant have lungs that tend to collapse each time they breathe out. Unless treated, this condition, called respiratory distress syndrome, is fatal. Basic scientific experiments, carried out using cells from chicken lungs, support the potential for using steroids as a means of furthering the development of type II alveolar cells. In fact, once a premature birth is threatened, every effort is made to delay the birth, and a series of steroid injections is frequently administered to the mother during this delay in an effort to promote lung maturation.

==== Contributions to whole body functions ====
The lung vessels contain a fibrinolytic system that dissolves clots that may have arrived in the pulmonary circulation by embolism, often from the deep veins in the legs. They also release a variety of substances that enter the systemic arterial blood, and they remove other substances from the systemic venous blood that reach them via the pulmonary artery. Some prostaglandins are removed from the circulation, while others are synthesized in the lungs and released into the blood when lung tissue is stretched.

The lungs activate one hormone. The physiologically inactive decapeptide angiotensin I is converted to the aldosterone-releasing octapeptide, angiotensin II, in the pulmonary circulation. The reaction occurs in other tissues as well, but it is particularly prominent in the lungs. Angiotensin II also has a direct effect on arteriolar walls, causing arteriolar vasoconstriction, and consequently a rise in arterial blood pressure. Large amounts of the angiotensin-converting enzyme responsible for this activation are located on the surfaces of the endothelial cells of the alveolar capillaries. The converting enzyme also inactivates bradykinin. Circulation time through the alveolar capillaries is less than one second, yet 70% of the angiotensin I reaching the lungs is converted to angiotensin II in a single trip through the capillaries. Four other peptidases have been identified on the surface of the pulmonary endothelial cells.

==== Vocalization ====
The movement of gas through the larynx, pharynx and mouth allows humans to speak, or phonate. Vocalization, or singing, in birds occurs via the syrinx, an organ located at the base of the trachea. The vibration of air flowing across the larynx (vocal cords), in humans, and the syrinx, in birds, results in sound. Because of this, gas movement is vital for communication purposes.

==== Temperature control ====
Panting in dogs, cats, birds and some other animals provides a means of reducing body temperature, by evaporating saliva in the mouth (instead of evaporating sweat on the skin).

=== Clinical significance ===
Disorders of the respiratory system can be classified into several general groups:

- Airway obstructive conditions (e.g. emphysema, bronchitis, asthma)
- Pulmonary restrictive conditions (e.g. fibrosis, sarcoidosis, alveolar damage, pleural effusion)
- Vascular diseases (e.g. pulmonary edema, pulmonary embolism, pulmonary hypertension)
- Infectious, environmental and other "diseases" (e.g. pneumonia, tuberculosis, asbestosis, particulate pollutants)
- Primary cancers (e.g. bronchial carcinoma, mesothelioma)
- Secondary cancers (e.g. cancers that originated elsewhere in the body, but have seeded themselves in the lungs)
- Insufficient surfactant (e.g. respiratory distress syndrome in pre-term babies)

Disorders of the respiratory system are usually treated by a pulmonologist and respiratory therapist.

Where there is an inability to breathe or insufficiency in breathing, a medical ventilator may be used.

== Exceptional mammals ==
=== Cetaceans ===
Cetaceans have lungs, which means that they breathe air. An individual can last without a breath from a few minutes to over two hours depending on the species. Whales are deliberate breathers: they must be awake to inhale and exhale. When stale air, warmed from the lungs, is exhaled, it condenses as it meets colder external air. As with a terrestrial mammal breathing out on a cold day, a small cloud of 'steam' appears. This is called the 'spout' and varies across species in shape, angle and height. Species can be identified at a distance using this characteristic.

The structure of the respiratory and circulatory systems is of particular importance for the life of marine mammals. The oxygen balance is effective. Each breath can replace up to 90% of the total lung volume. For land mammals, in comparison, this value is usually about 15%. During inhalation, about twice as much oxygen is absorbed by the lung tissue as in a land mammal. As with all mammals, the oxygen is stored in the blood and the lungs, but in cetaceans, it is also stored in various tissues, mainly in the muscles. Here, this happens through the muscle pigment, myoglobin, provides an effective bond. This additional oxygen storage is vital for deep diving, since beyond a depth around 100 m (330 ft), the lung tissue is almost completely compressed by the water pressure.

=== Horses ===
Horses are obligate nasal breathers which means that they are different from many other mammals because they do not have the option of breathing through their mouths and must take in air through their noses. A flap of tissue called the soft palate blocks off the pharynx from the mouth (oral cavity) of the horse, except when swallowing. This helps to prevent the horse from inhaling food, but does not allow use of the mouth to breathe when in respiratory distress, a horse can only breathe through its nostrils.

=== Elephants ===
The elephant is the only mammal known to have no pleural space. Instead, the parietal and visceral pleura are both composed of dense connective tissue and joined to each other via loose connective tissue. This lack of a pleural space, along with an unusually thick diaphragm, are thought to be evolutionary adaptations allowing the elephant to remain underwater for long periods while breathing through its trunk which emerges as a snorkel.

In the elephant the lungs are attached to the diaphragm and breathing relies mainly on the diaphragm rather than the expansion of the ribcage.

== Birds ==
Fig. 15 The arrangement of the air sacs and lungs in birds

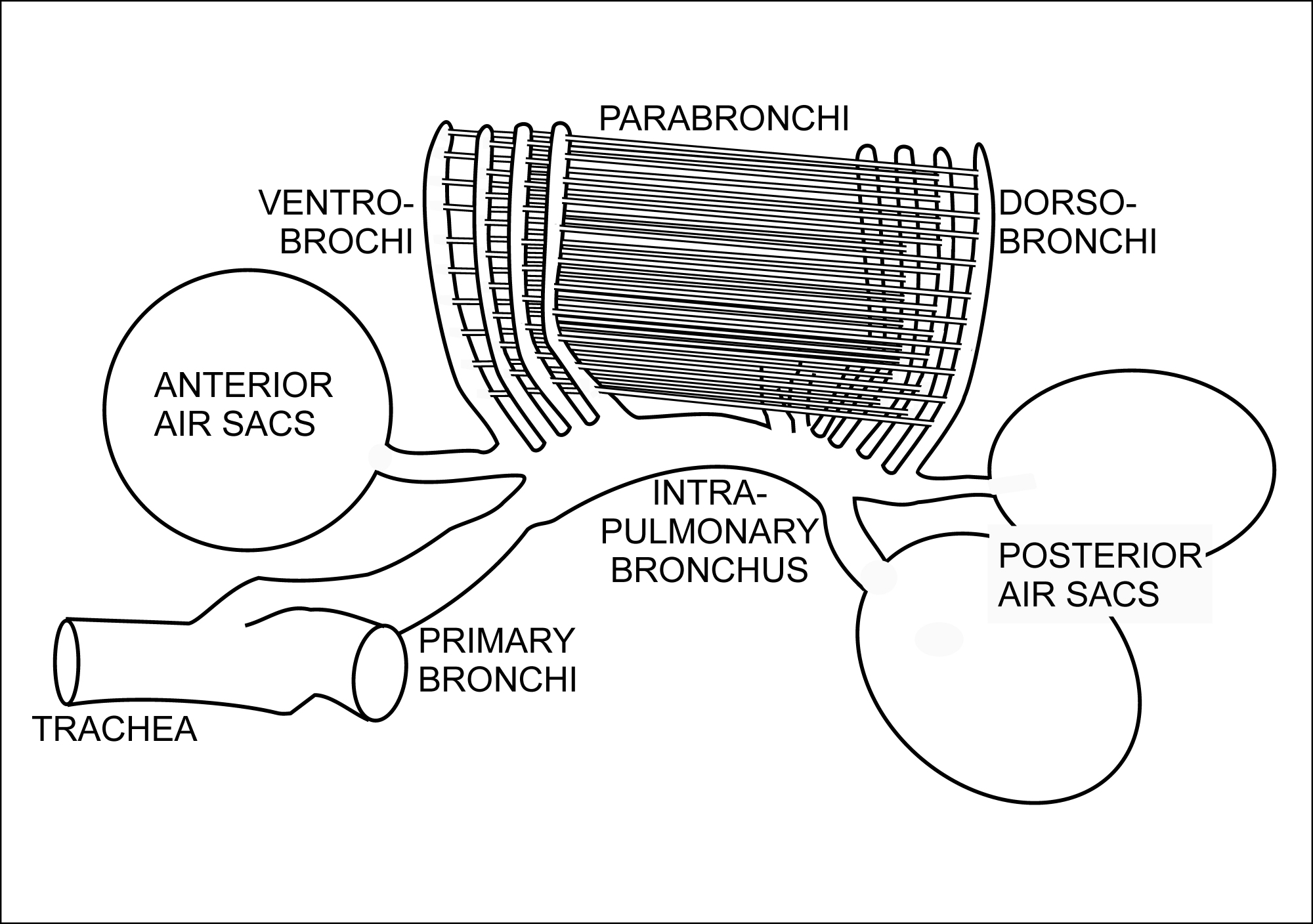
Fig. 16 The anatomy of bird's respiratory system, showing the relationships of the trachea, primary and intra-pulmonary bronchi, the dorso- and ventro-bronchi, with the parabronchi running between the two. The posterior and anterior air sacs are also indicated, but not to scale.

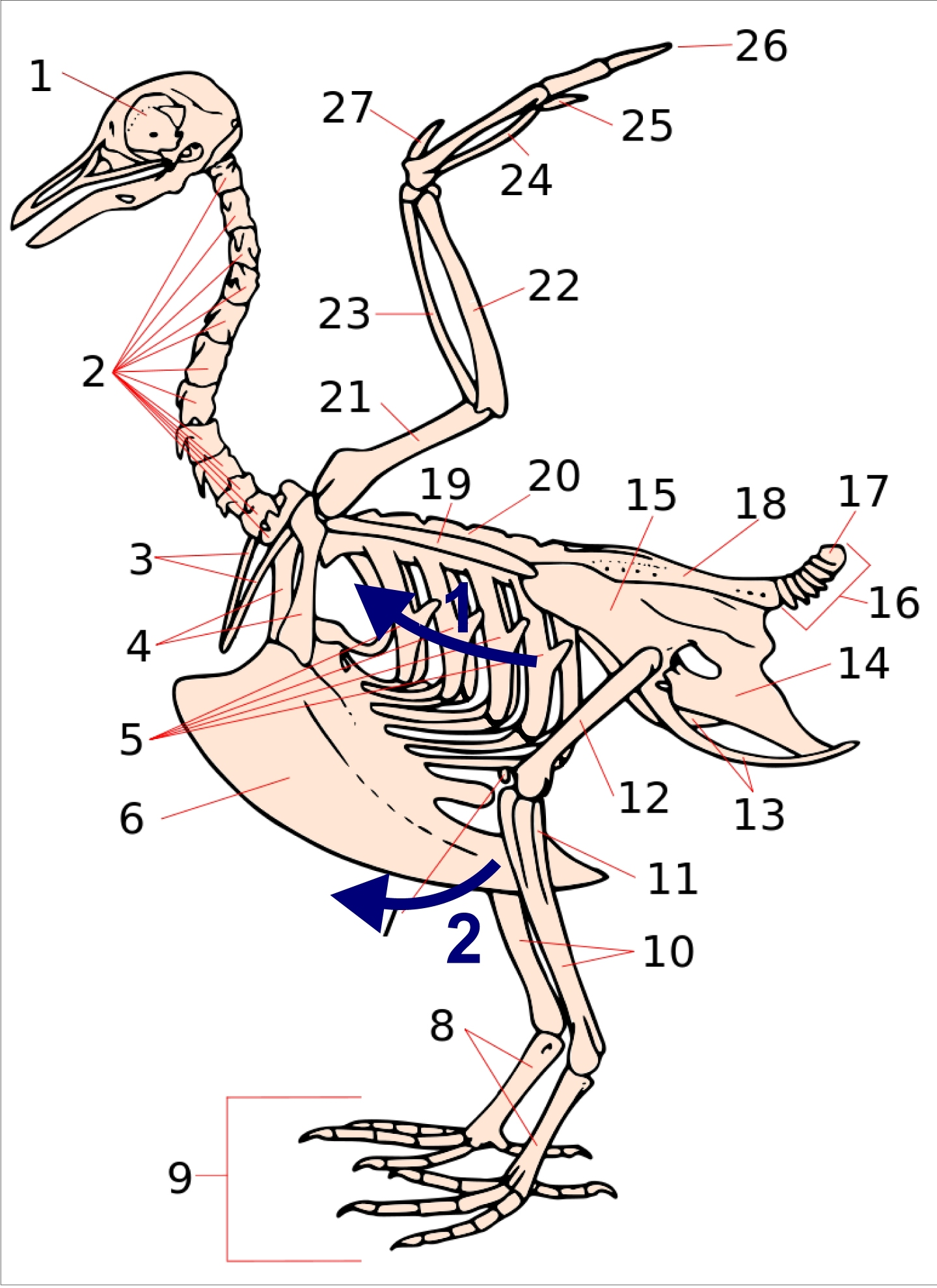
Fig. 17 A dove skeleton, showing the movement of the chest during inhalation. Arrow 1 indicates the movement of the vertebral ribs. Arrow 2 shows the consequent movement of the sternum (and its keel). The two movements increase the vertical and transverse diameters of the chest portion of the trunk of the bird. Key: 1. skull; 2. cervical vertebrae; 3. furcula; 4. coracoid; 5. vertebral ribs; 6. sternum and its keel; 7. patella; 8. tarsus; 9. digits; 10. tibia (tibiotarsus); 11. fibula (tibiotarsus); 12. femur; 13. ischium (innominate); 14. pubis (innominate); 15. ilium (innominate); 16. caudal vertebrae; 17. pygostyle; 18. synsacrum; 19. scapula; 20. dorsal vertebrae; 21. humerus; 22. ulna; 23. radius; 24. carpus (carpometacarpus); 25. metacarpus (carpometacarpus); 26. digits; 27. alula

The respiratory system of birds differs significantly from that found in mammals. Firstly, they have rigid lungs which do not expand and contract during the breathing cycle. Instead an extensive system of air sacs (Fig. 15) distributed throughout their bodies act as the bellows drawing environmental air into the sacs, and expelling the spent air after it has passed through the lungs (Fig. 18). Birds also do not have diaphragms or pleural cavities.

Bird lungs are smaller than those in mammals of comparable size, but the air sacs account for 15% of the total body volume, compared to the 7% devoted to the alveoli which act as the bellows in mammals.

Inhalation and exhalation are brought about by alternately increasing and decreasing the volume of the entire thoraco-abdominal cavity (or coelom) using both their abdominal and costal muscles. During inhalation the muscles attached to the vertebral ribs (Fig. 17) contract angling them forwards and outwards. This pushes the sternal ribs, to which they are attached at almost right angles, downwards and forwards, taking the sternum (with its prominent keel) in the same direction (Fig. 17). This increases both the vertical and transverse diameters of thoracic portion of the trunk. The forward and downward movement of, particularly, the posterior end of the sternum pulls the abdominal wall downwards, increasing the volume of that region of the trunk as well. The increase in volume of the entire trunk cavity reduces the air pressure in all the thoraco-abdominal air sacs, causing them to fill with air as described below.

During exhalation the external oblique muscle which is attached to the sternum and vertebral ribs anteriorly, and to the pelvis (pubis and ilium in Fig. 17) posteriorly (forming part of the abdominal wall) reverses the inhalatory movement, while compressing the abdominal contents, thus increasing the pressure in all the air sacs. Air is therefore expelled from the respiratory system in the act of exhalation.

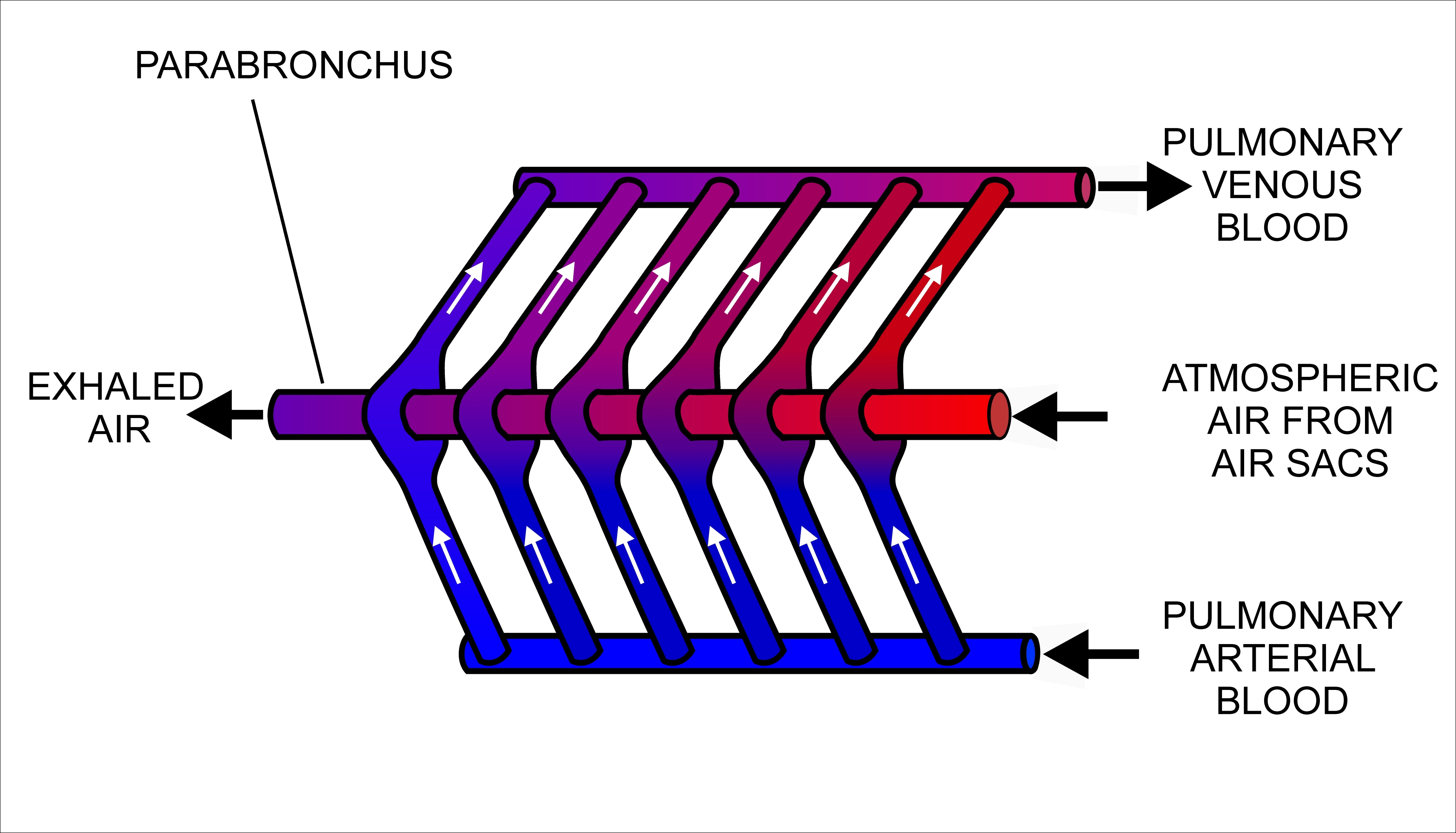
Fig. 19 The cross-current respiratory gas exchanger in the lungs of birds. Air is forced from the air sacs unidirectionally (from right to left in the diagram) through the parabronchi. The pulmonary capillaries surround the parabronchi in the manner shown (blood flowing from below the parabronchus to above it in the diagram). Blood or air with a high oxygen content is shown in red; oxygen-poor air or blood is shown in various shades of purple-blue.

During inhalation air enters the trachea via the nostrils and mouth, and continues to just beyond the syrinx at which point the trachea branches into two primary bronchi, going to the two lungs (Fig. 16). The primary bronchi enter the lungs to become the intrapulmonary bronchi, which give off a set of parallel branches called ventrobronchi and, a little further on, an equivalent set of dorsobronchi (Fig. 16). The ends of the intrapulmonary bronchi discharge air into the posterior air sacs at the caudal end of the bird. Each pair of dorso-ventrobronchi is connected by a large number of parallel microscopic air capillaries (or parabronchi) where gas exchange occurs (Fig. 16). As the bird inhales, tracheal air flows through the intrapulmonary bronchi into the posterior air sacs, as well as into the dorsobronchi, but not into the ventrobronchi (Fig. 18). This is due to the bronchial architecture which directs the inhaled air away from the openings of the ventrobronchi, into the continuation of the intrapulmonary bronchus towards the dorsobronchi and posterior air sacs. From the dorsobronchi the inhaled air flows through the parabronchi (and therefore the gas exchanger) to the ventrobronchi from where the air can only escape into the expanding anterior air sacs. So, during inhalation, both the posterior and anterior air sacs expand, the posterior air sacs filling with fresh inhaled air, while the anterior air sacs fill with "spent" (oxygen-poor) air that has just passed through the lungs.

Fig. 18 Inhalation-exhalation cycle in birds

During exhalation the pressure in the posterior air sacs (which were filled with fresh air during inhalation) increases due to the contraction of the oblique muscle described above. The aerodynamics of the interconnecting openings from the posterior air sacs to the dorsobronchi and intrapulmonary bronchi ensures that the air leaves these sacs in the direction of the lungs (via the dorsobronchi), rather than returning down the intrapulmonary bronchi (Fig. 18). From the dorsobronchi the fresh air from the posterior air sacs flows through the parabronchi (in the same direction as occurred during inhalation) into ventrobronchi. The air passages connecting the ventrobronchi and anterior air sacs to the intrapulmonary bronchi direct the "spent", oxygen poor air from these two organs to the trachea from where it escapes to the exterior. Oxygenated air therefore flows constantly (during the entire breathing cycle) in a single direction through the parabronchi.

The blood flow through the bird lung is at right angles to the flow of air through the parabronchi, forming a cross-current flow exchange system (Fig. 19). The partial pressure of oxygen in the parabronchi declines along their lengths as O_{2} diffuses into the blood. The blood capillaries leaving the exchanger near the entrance of airflow take up more O_{2} than do the capillaries leaving near the exit end of the parabronchi. When the contents of all capillaries mix, the final partial pressure of oxygen of the mixed pulmonary venous blood is higher than that of the exhaled air, but is nevertheless less than half that of the inhaled air, thus achieving roughly the same systemic arterial blood partial pressure of oxygen as mammals do with their bellows-type lungs.

The trachea is an area of dead space: the oxygen-poor air it contains at the end of exhalation is the first air to re-enter the posterior air sacs and lungs. In comparison to the mammalian respiratory tract, the dead space volume in a bird is, on average, 4.5 times greater than it is in mammals of the same size. Birds with long necks will inevitably have long tracheae, and must therefore take deeper breaths than mammals do to make allowances for their greater dead space volumes. In some birds (e.g. the whooper swan, Cygnus cygnus, the white spoonbill, Platalea leucorodia, the whooping crane, Grus americana, and the helmeted curassow, Pauxi pauxi) the trachea, which in some cranes can be 1.5 m long, is coiled back and forth within the body, drastically increasing the dead space ventilation.

== Reptiles ==
Fig. 20 X-ray video of a female American alligator while breathing

The anatomical structure of the lungs is less complex in reptiles than in mammals, with reptiles lacking the very extensive airway tree structure found in mammalian lungs. Gas exchange in reptiles still occurs in alveoli however. Reptiles do not possess a diaphragm. Thus, breathing occurs via a change in the volume of the body cavity which is controlled by contraction of intercostal muscles in all reptiles except turtles. In turtles, contraction of specific pairs of flank muscles governs inhalation and exhalation. Crocodilians, iguanas and monitor lizards, like birds, use a unidirectional breathing system.

== Amphibians ==
Both the lungs and the skin serve as respiratory organs in amphibians. The ventilation of the lungs in amphibians relies on positive pressure ventilation. Muscles lower the floor of the oral cavity, enlarging it and drawing in air through the nostrils into the oral cavity. With the nostrils and mouth closed, the floor of the oral cavity is then pushed up, which forces air down the trachea into the lungs. The skin of these animals is highly vascularized and moist, with moisture maintained via secretion of mucus from specialised cells, and is involved in cutaneous respiration. While the lungs are of primary organs for gas exchange between the blood and the environmental air (when out of the water), the skin's unique properties aid rapid gas exchange when amphibians are submerged in oxygen-rich water. Some amphibians have gills, either in the early stages of their development (e.g. tadpoles of frogs), while others retain them into adulthood (e.g. some salamanders).

== Fish ==
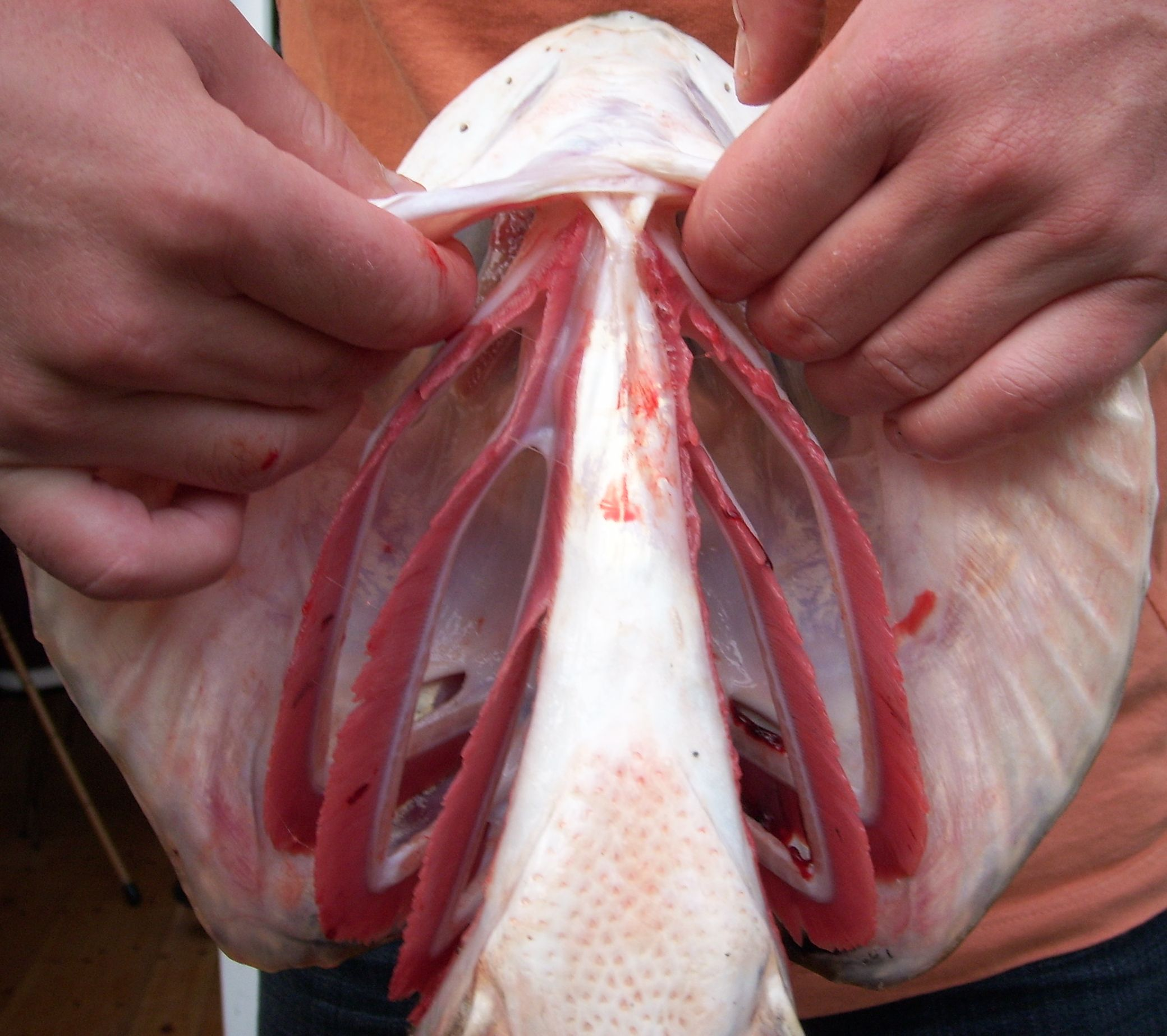
Fig. 21. The operculum or gill cover of a pike has been pulled open to expose the gill arches bearing filaments.

Fig. 22. A comparison between the operations and effects of a cocurrent and a countercurrent flow exchange system is depicted by the upper and lower diagrams respectively. In both, it is assumed that red has a higher value (e.g. of temperature or the partial pressure of a gas) than blue and that the property being transported in the channels, therefore, flows from red to blue. In fish a countercurrent flow (lower diagram) of blood and water in the gills is used to extract oxygen from the environment.

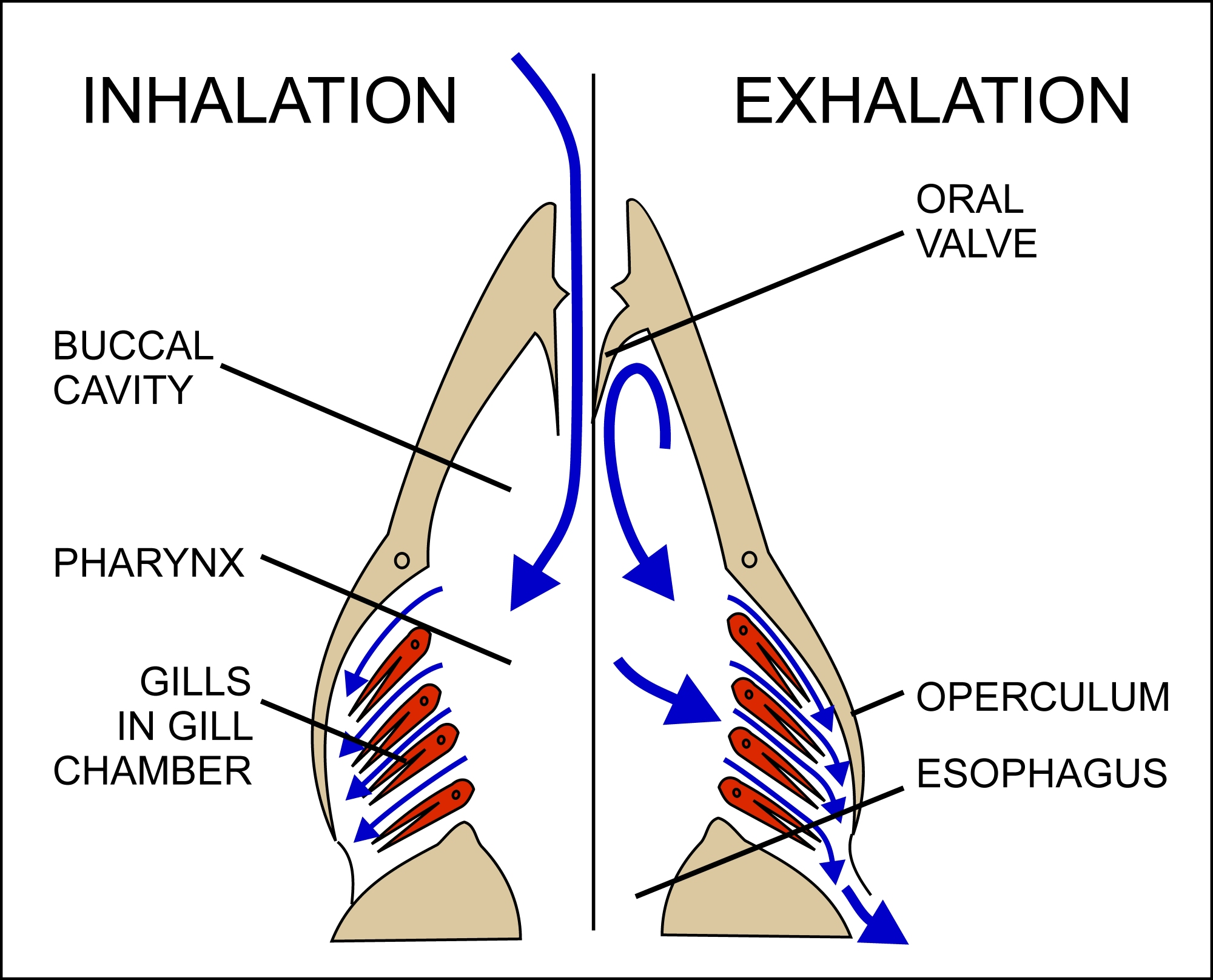
Fig. 23 The respiratory mechanism in bony fish. The inhalatory process is on the left, the exhalatory process on the right. The movement of water is indicated by the blue arrows.

Oxygen is poorly soluble in water. Fully aerated fresh water therefore contains only 8–10 ml O_{2}/liter compared to the O_{2} concentration of 210 ml/liter in the air at sea level. Furthermore, the coefficient of diffusion (i.e. the rate at which a substances diffuses from a region of high concentration to one of low concentration, under standard conditions) of the respiratory gases is typically 10,000 faster in air than in water. Thus oxygen, for instance, has a diffusion coefficient of 17.6 mm^{2}/s in air, but only 0.0021 mm^{2}/s in water. The corresponding values for carbon dioxide are 16 mm^{2}/s in air and 0.0016 mm^{2}/s in water. This means that when oxygen is taken up from the water in contact with a gas exchanger, it is replaced considerably more slowly by the oxygen from the oxygen-rich regions small distances away from the exchanger than would have occurred in air. Fish have developed gills deal with these problems. Gills are specialized organs containing filaments, which further divide into lamellae. The lamellae contain a dense thin walled capillary network that exposes a large gas exchange surface area to the very large volumes of water passing over them.

Gills use a countercurrent exchange system that increases the efficiency of oxygen-uptake from the water. Fresh oxygenated water taken in through the mouth is uninterruptedly "pumped" through the gills in one direction, while the blood in the lamellae flows in the opposite direction, creating the countercurrent blood and water flow (Fig. 22), on which the fish's survival depends.

Water is drawn in through the mouth by closing the operculum (gill cover), and enlarging the mouth cavity (Fig. 23). Simultaneously the gill chambers enlarge, producing a lower pressure there than in the mouth causing water to flow over the gills. The mouth cavity then contracts, inducing the closure of the passive oral valves, thereby preventing the back-flow of water from the mouth (Fig. 23). The water in the mouth is, instead, forced over the gills, while the gill chambers contract emptying the water they contain through the opercular openings (Fig. 23). Back-flow into the gill chamber during the inhalatory phase is prevented by a membrane along the ventroposterior border of the operculum (diagram on the left in Fig. 23). Thus the mouth cavity and gill chambers act alternately as suction pump and pressure pump to maintain a steady flow of water over the gills in one direction. Since the blood in the lamellar capillaries flows in the opposite direction to that of the water, the consequent countercurrent flow of blood and water maintains steep concentration gradients for oxygen and carbon dioxide along the entire length of each capillary (lower diagram in Fig. 22). Oxygen is, therefore, able to continually diffuse down its gradient into the blood, and the carbon dioxide down its gradient into the water. Although countercurrent exchange systems theoretically allow an almost complete transfer of a respiratory gas from one side of the exchanger to the other, in fish less than 80% of the oxygen in the water flowing over the gills is generally transferred to the blood.

In certain active pelagic sharks, water passes through the mouth and over the gills while they are moving, in a process known as "ram ventilation". While at rest, most sharks pump water over their gills, as most bony fish do, to ensure that oxygenated water continues to flow over their gills. But a small number of species have lost the ability to pump water through their gills and must swim without rest. These species are obligate ram ventilators and would presumably asphyxiate if unable to move. Obligate ram ventilation is also true of some pelagic bony fish species.

There are a few fish that can obtain oxygen for brief periods of time from air swallowed from above the surface of the water. Thus lungfish possess one or two lungs, and the labyrinth fish have developed a special "labyrinth organ", which characterizes this suborder of fish. The labyrinth organ is a much-folded suprabranchial accessory breathing organ. It is formed by a vascularized expansion of the epibranchial bone of the first gill arch, and is used for respiration in air. This organ allows labyrinth fish to take in oxygen directly from the air, instead of taking it from the water in which they reside through the use of gills. The labyrinth organ helps the oxygen in the inhaled air to be absorbed into the bloodstream. As a result, labyrinth fish can survive for a short period of time out of water, as they can inhale the air around them, provided they stay moist. Labyrinth fish are not born with functional labyrinth organs. The development of the organ is gradual and most juvenile labyrinth fish breathe entirely with their gills and develop the labyrinth organs when they grow older.

== Invertebrates ==
=== Arthropods ===
Some species of crab use a respiratory organ called a branchiostegal lung. Its gill-like structure increases the surface area for gas exchange which is more suited to taking oxygen from the air than from water. Some of the smallest spiders and mites can breathe simply by exchanging gas through the surface of the body. Larger spiders, scorpions and other arthropods use a primitive book lung.

==== Insects ====
Most insects breath passively through their spiracles (special openings in the exoskeleton) and the air reaches every part of the body by means of a series of smaller and smaller tubes called 'trachaea' when their diameters are relatively large, and 'tracheoles' when their diameters are very small. The tracheoles make contact with individual cells throughout the body. They are partially filled with fluid, which can be withdrawn from the individual tracheoles when the tissues, such as muscles, are active and have a high demand for oxygen, bringing the air closer to the active cells. This is probably brought about by the buildup of lactic acid in the active muscles causing an osmotic gradient, moving the water out of the tracheoles and into the active cells. Diffusion of gases is effective over small distances but not over larger ones, this is one of the reasons insects are all relatively small. Insects which do not have spiracles and trachaea, such as some Collembola, breathe directly through their skins, also by diffusion of gases.

The number of spiracles an insect has is variable between species, however, they always come in pairs, one on each side of the body, and usually one pair per segment. Some of the Diplura have eleven, with four pairs on the thorax, but in most of the ancient forms of insects, such as Dragonflies and Grasshoppers there are two thoracic and eight abdominal spiracles. However, in most of the remaining insects, there are fewer. It is at the level of the tracheoles that oxygen is delivered to the cells for respiration.

Insects were once believed to exchange gases with the environment continuously by the simple diffusion of gases into the tracheal system. More recently, however, large variation in insect ventilatory patterns has been documented and insect respiration appears to be highly variable. Some small insects do not demonstrate continuous respiratory movements and may lack muscular control of the spiracles. Others, however, utilize muscular contraction of the abdomen along with coordinated spiracle contraction and relaxation to generate cyclical gas exchange patterns and to reduce water loss into the atmosphere. The most extreme form of these patterns is termed discontinuous gas exchange cycles.

=== Molluscs ===
Molluscs generally possess gills that allow gas exchange between the aqueous environment and their circulatory systems. These animals also possess a heart that pumps blood containing hemocyanin as its oxygen-capturing molecule. Hence, this respiratory system is similar to that of vertebrate fish. The respiratory system of gastropods can include either gills or a lung.

== Plants ==
Plants use carbon dioxide gas in the process of photosynthesis, and exhale oxygen gas as waste. The chemical equation of photosynthesis is 6 CO_{2} (carbon dioxide) and 6 H_{2}O (water), which in the presence of sunlight makes C_{6}H_{12}O_{6} (glucose) and 6 O_{2} (oxygen). Photosynthesis uses electrons on the carbon atoms as the repository for the energy obtained from sunlight. Respiration is the opposite of photosynthesis. It reclaims the energy to power chemical reactions in cells. In so doing the carbon atoms and their electrons are combined with oxygen forming CO_{2} which is easily removed from both the cells and the organism. Plants use both processes, photosynthesis to capture the energy and oxidative metabolism to use it.

Plant respiration is limited by the process of diffusion. Plants take in carbon dioxide through holes, known as stomata, that can open and close on the undersides of their leaves and sometimes other parts of their anatomy. Most plants require some oxygen for catabolic processes (break-down reactions that release energy). But the quantity of O_{2} used per hour is small as they are not involved in activities that require high rates of aerobic metabolism. Their requirement for air, however, is very high as they need CO_{2} for photosynthesis, which constitutes only 0.04% of the environmental air. Thus, to make 1 g of glucose requires the removal of all the CO_{2} from at least 18.7 liters of air at sea level. But inefficiencies in the photosynthetic process cause considerably greater volumes of air to be used.

== See also ==
- Great Oxidation Event – Paleoproterozoic surge in atmospheric oxygen
- Respiratory adaptation – Breathing changes caused by exertion
- Spirometry – Pulmonary function test
- Pulmonary function testing (PFT)
- Liquid breathing
