= Discontinuous gas exchange =

Discontinuous gas-exchange cycles (DGC), also called discontinuous ventilation or discontinuous ventilatory cycles, follow one of several patterns of arthropod gas exchange that have been documented primarily in insects; they occur when the insect is at rest. During DGC, oxygen (O_{2}) uptake and carbon dioxide (CO_{2}) release from the whole insect follow a cyclical pattern characterized by periods of little to no release of CO_{2} to the external environment. Discontinuous gas exchange is traditionally defined in three phases, whose names reflect the behaviour of the spiracles: the closed phase, the flutter phase, and the open phase.

Until recently, insect respiration was believed to occur entirely by simple diffusion. It was believed that air entered the tracheae through the spiracles, and diffused through the tracheal system to the tracheoles, whereupon O_{2} was delivered to the cells. However, even at rest, insects show a wide variety of gas exchange patterns, ranging from largely diffusive continuous ventilation, to cyclic respiration, of which discontinuous gas exchange cycles are the most striking.

Discontinuous gas exchange cycles have been described in over 50 insect species, most of which are large beetles (order Coleoptera) or butterflies or moths (order Lepidoptera). As the cycles have evolved more than once within the insects, discontinuous gas exchange cycles are likely adaptive, but the mechanisms and significance of their evolution are currently under debate.

== Phases ==
Discontinuous gas exchange cycles are characterized by a repeating pattern of three phases. These phases are named according to the behaviour of the spiracles and are most commonly identified by their CO_{2} output, primarily observed using open flow respirometry.

=== Closed phase ===
During the closed phase of discontinuous gas exchange cycles, the spiracle muscles contract, causing the spiracles to shut tight. At the initiation of the closed phase, the partial pressure of both O_{2} and CO_{2} is close to that of the external environment, but closure of the spiracles drastically reduces the capacity for the exchange of gases with the external environment. Independent of cycles of insect ventilation which may be discontinuous, cellular respiration on a whole animal level continues at a constant rate. As O_{2} is consumed, its partial pressure decreases within the tracheal system. In contrast, as CO_{2} is produced by the cells, it is buffered in the haemolymph rather than being exported to the tracheal system. This mismatch between O_{2} consumption and CO_{2} production within the tracheal system leads to a negative pressure inside the system relative to the external environment. Once the partial pressure of O_{2} in the tracheal system drops below a lower limit, activity in the nervous system causes the initiation of the flutter phase.

=== Flutter phase ===
During the flutter phase of discontinuous gas exchange cycles, spiracles open slightly and close in rapid succession. As a result of the negative pressure within the tracheal system, created during the closed phase, a small amount of air from the environment enters the respiratory system each time the spiracles are opened. However, the negative internal pressure also prevents the liberation of CO_{2} from the haemolymph and its exportation through the tracheal system. As a result, during the flutter phase, additional O_{2} from the environment is acquired to satisfy cellular O_{2} demand, while little to no CO_{2} is released. The flutter phase may continue even after tracheal pressure is equal to that of the environment, and the acquisition of O_{2} may be assisted in some insects by active ventilatory movements such as contraction of the abdomen. The flutter phase continues until CO_{2} production surpasses the buffering capacity of the haemolymph and begins to build up within the tracheal system. CO_{2} within the tracheal system has both a direct (acting on the muscle tissue) and indirect (through the nervous system) impact on the spiracle muscles and they are opened widely, initiating the open phase.

=== Open phase ===
A rapid release of CO_{2} to the environment characterizes the open phase of discontinuous gas exchange cycles. During the open phase, spiracular muscles relax and the spiracles open completely. The open phase may initiate a single, rapid release of CO_{2}, or several spikes declining in amplitude with time as a result of the repeated opening and closing of the spiracles. During the open phase, a complete exchange of gases with the environment occurs entirely by diffusion in some species, but may be assisted by active ventilatory movements in others.

== Variability in discontinuous gas exchange cycles ==
The great variation in insect respiratory cycles can largely be explained by differences in spiracle function, body size and metabolic rate. Gas exchange may occur through a single open spiracle, or the coordination of several spiracles. Spiracle function is controlled almost entirely by the nervous system. In most insects that demonstrate discontinuous gas exchange, spiracle movements and active ventilation are closely coordinated by the nervous system to generate unidirectional air flow within the tracheal system. This coordination leads to the highly regulated bursting pattern of CO_{2} release. Building CO_{2} levels during the flutter phase may either directly affect spiracular opening, affect the nervous system while being pumped through the haemolymph, or both. However, the effects of CO_{2} on both spiracles and the nervous system do not appear to be related to changes in pH.

Variability in discontinuous gas exchange cycles is also dependent upon external stimuli such as temperature and the partial pressure of O_{2} and CO_{2} in the external environment. Environmental stimuli may affect one or more aspects of discontinuous cycling, such as cycle frequency and the quantity of CO_{2} released at each burst. Temperature can have massive effects on the metabolic rate of ectothermic animals, and changes in metabolic rate can create large differences in discontinuous gas exchange cycles. At a species-specific low temperature discontinuous gas exchange cycles are known to cease entirely, as muscle function is lost and spiracles relax and open. The temperature at which muscular function is lost is known as the chill coma temperature.

Discontinuous gas exchange cycles vary widely among different species of insects, and these differences have been used in the past to support or refute hypotheses of the evolution of respiratory cycling in insects.

== Evolution of discontinuous gas exchange cycles ==
Despite being well described, the mechanisms responsible for the evolution of discontinuous gas exchange cycles are largely unknown. Discontinuous gas exchange cycles have long been thought to be an adaptation to conserve water when living in a terrestrial environment (the hygric hypothesis). However, recent studies question the hygric hypothesis, and several alternative hypotheses have been proposed. For discontinuous gas exchange cycles to be considered adaptive, the origin and subsequent persistence of the trait must be demonstrated to be a result of natural selection.

=== Hygric hypothesis ===
The hygric hypothesis was first proposed in 1953, making it the earliest posed hypothesis for the evolution of discontinuous gas exchange. The hygric hypothesis proposes that the discontinuous release of CO_{2} is an adaptation that allows terrestrial insects to limit respiratory water loss to the environment. This hypothesis is supported by studies that have demonstrated that respiratory water loss is substantially higher in insects forced to keep their spiracles open, than those of the same species who exhibit discontinuous gas exchange. In addition, laboratory selection experiments on Drosophila melanogaster have shown that more variable gas exchange patterns can emerge in populations of insects artificially selected for tolerance to dry conditions. However, water loss during discontinuous gas exchange is only limited during the flutter phase if gas exchange during the flutter phase is convective (or assisted by muscular contraction). From a water conservation perspective, if ventilation during the flutter phase occurs entirely by simple diffusion, there is no benefit to having a flutter phase. This has led to the belief that some other factor may have contributed to the evolution of discontinuous gas exchange in insects.

=== Chthonic and chthonic-hygric hypotheses ===
Following work on harvester ants in 1995, doctors John Lighton and David Berrigan proposed the chthonic hypothesis. It was observed that many insects that demonstrate discontinuous gas exchange cycles are exposed to hypoxia (low O_{2} levels) and hypercapnia (high CO_{2} levels) by spending at least part of their life cycle in enclosed spaces underground. Lighton and Berrigan hypothesized that discontinuous gas exchange cycles may be an adaptation to maximize partial pressure gradients between an insect's respiratory system and the environment in which it lives. Alternatively, insects could obtain enough O_{2} by opening their spiracles for extended periods of time. However, unless their environment is very humid, water will be lost from the respiratory system to the environment. Discontinuous gas exchange cycles, therefore, may limit water loss while facilitating O_{2} consumption and CO_{2} removal in such environments. Many researchers describe this theory as the chthonic-hygric hypothesis and consider it to support the hygric hypothesis. However, others emphasize the importance of maximizing partial pressure gradients alone and consider the chthonic hypothesis to be distinct from the hygric hypothesis.

=== Oxidative damage hypothesis ===
The oxidative damage hypothesis states that discontinuous gas exchange cycles are an adaptation to reduce the amount of O_{2} delivered to tissues under periods of low metabolic rate. During the open phase, O_{2} partial pressure in the tracheal system reaches levels near that of the external environment. However, over time during the closed phase the partial pressure of O_{2} drops, limiting the overall exposure of tissues to O_{2} over time. This would lead to the expectation of prolonged flutter periods in insects that may be particularly sensitive to high levels of O_{2} within the body. Strangely however, termites that carry a highly oxygen-sensitive symbiotic bacteria demonstrate continuous, diffusive ventilation.

=== Strolling arthropods hypothesis ===
The strolling arthropods hypothesis was a very early hypothesis for the evolution of discontinuous gas exchange cycles. It was postulated that discontinuous gas exchange cycles and spiracles which close off the respiratory system, may in part do so to prevent small arthropod parasites such as mites and particulate matter such as dust from entering the respiratory system. This hypothesis was largely dismissed in the 1970s, but has recently gained additional attention. The strolling arthropods hypothesis is supported by evidence that tracheal parasites can substantially limit O_{2} delivery to the flight muscles of active honeybees. As a result of large populations of tracheal mites, honeybees are unable to reach metabolic rates in flight muscle necessary for flight, and are grounded.
