= Respiratory system of insects =

Development of the tracheal system in Drosophila melanogaster.

An insect's respiratory system is the system with which it introduces respiratory gases to its interior and performs gas exchange.

Air enters the respiratory systems of insects through a series of external openings called spiracles. These external openings, which act as muscular valves in some insects, lead to the internal respiratory system, a densely networked array of tubes called tracheae. This network of transverse and longitudinal tracheae equalizes pressure throughout the system.

It is responsible for delivering sufficient oxygen (O_{2}) to all cells of the body and for removing carbon dioxide (CO_{2}) that is produced as a waste product of cellular respiration. The respiratory system of insects (and many other arthropods) is separate from the circulatory system.

== Structure of the spiracle ==
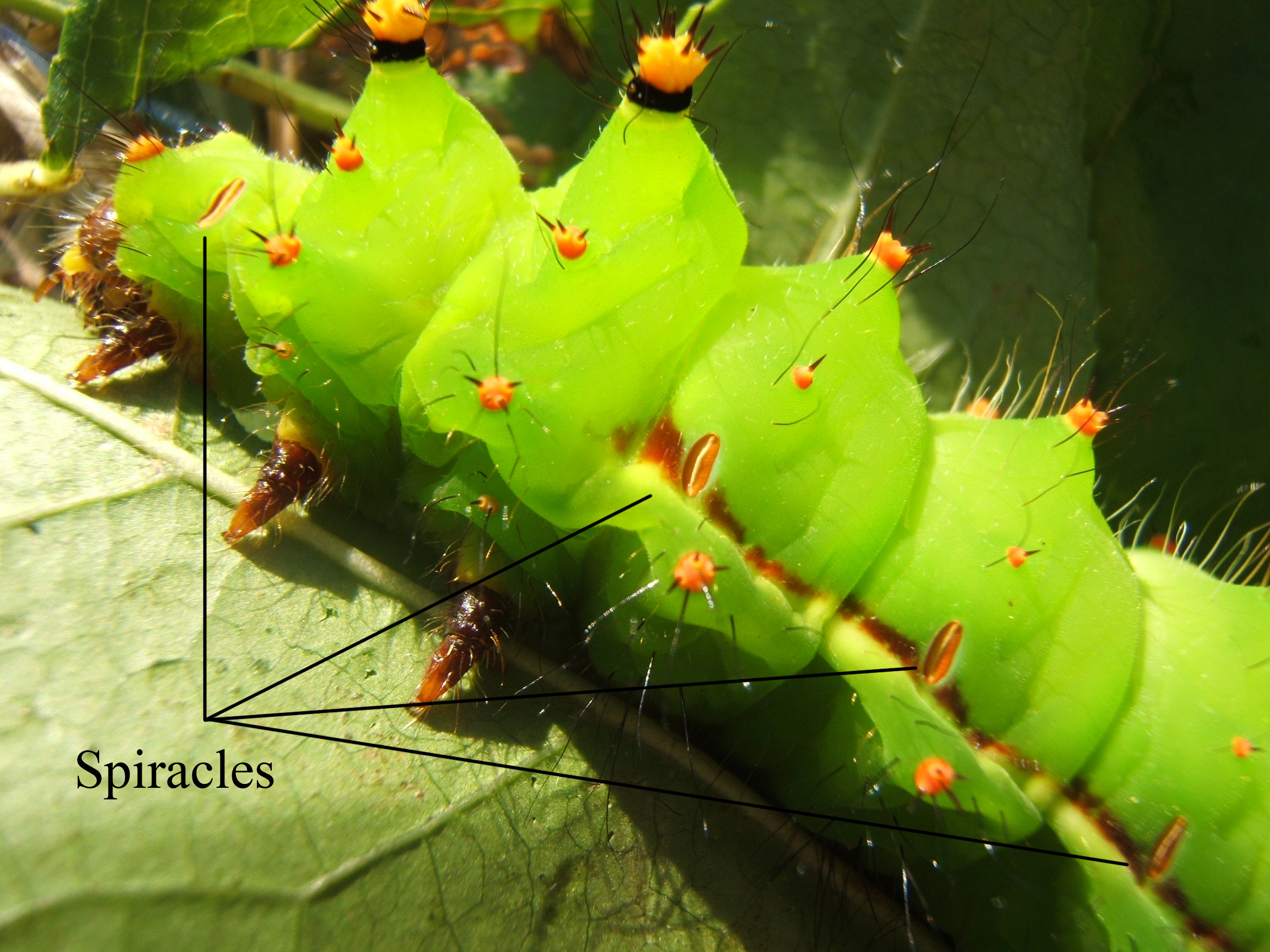
Indian moon moth (Actias selene) with some of the spiracles identified

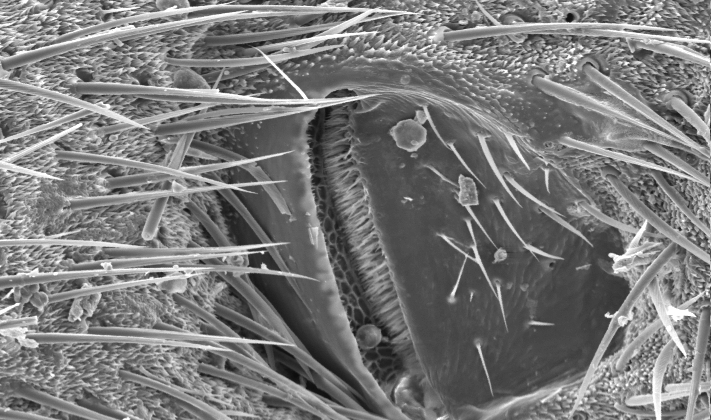
Scanning electron micrograph of a cricket spiracle valve

Insects have spiracles on their exoskeletons to allow air to enter the trachea. In insects, the tracheal tubes primarily deliver oxygen directly into the insects' tissues. The spiracles can be opened and closed in an efficient manner to reduce water loss. This is done by contracting closer muscles surrounding the spiracle. In order to open, the muscle relaxes. The closer muscle is controlled by the central nervous system but can also react to localized chemical stimuli. Several aquatic insects have similar or alternative closing methods to prevent water from entering the trachea. Spiracles can sometimes also be surrounded by hairs to minimize bulk air movement around the opening, and thus minimize water loss.

The spiracles are located laterally along the thorax and abdomen of most insects—usually one pair of spiracles per body segment. Air flow is regulated by small muscles that operate one or two flap-like valves within each spiracle—contracting to close the spiracle, or relaxing to open it.

== Structure of the tracheae ==
After passing through a spiracle, air enters a longitudinal tracheal trunk, eventually diffusing throughout a complex, branching network of tracheal tubes that subdivides into smaller and smaller diameters and reaches every part of the body. At the end of each tracheal branch, a special cell provides a thin, moist interface for the exchange of gases between atmospheric air and a living cell. Oxygen in the tracheal tube first dissolves in the liquid of the tracheole and then diffuses across the cell membrane into the cytoplasm of an adjacent cell. At the same time, carbon dioxide, produced as a waste product of cellular respiration, diffuses out of the cell and, eventually, out of the body through the tracheal system.

Each tracheal tube develops as an invagination of the ectoderm during embryonic development. To prevent its collapse under pressure, a thin, reinforcing "wire" of cuticle (the taenidia) winds spirally through the membranous wall. This design (similar in structure to a heater hose on an automobile or an exhaust duct on a clothes dryer) gives tracheal tubes the ability to flex and stretch without developing kinks that might restrict air flow.

The absence of taenidia in certain parts of the tracheal system allows the formation of collapsible air sacs, balloon-like structures that may store a reserve of air. In dry terrestrial environments, this temporary air supply allows an insect to conserve water by closing its spiracles during periods of high evaporative stress. Aquatic insects consume the stored air while under water or use it to regulate buoyancy. During a molt, air sacs fill and enlarge as the insect breaks free of the old exoskeleton and expands a new one. Between molts, the air sacs provide room for new growth—shrinking in volume as they are compressed by expansion of internal organs.

Small insects rely almost exclusively on passive diffusion and physical activity for the movement of gases within the tracheal system. However, larger insects may require active ventilation of the tracheal system (especially when active or under heat stress). They accomplish this by opening some spiracles and closing others while using abdominal muscles to alternately expand and contract body volume. Although these pulsating movements flush air from one end of the body to the other through the longitudinal tracheal trunks, diffusion is still important for distributing oxygen to individual cells through the network of smaller tracheal tubes. In fact, the rate of gas diffusion is regarded as one of the main limiting factors (along with weight of the exoskeleton) that limits the size of insects. Periods in Earth's ancient history, however, such as the Carboniferous, featured much higher oxygen levels (up to 35%) that allowed larger insects, such as Meganeura, along with arachnids, to evolve.

== Theoretical models ==
Insects were once believed to exchange gases with the environment continuously by the simple diffusion of gases into the tracheal system. More recently, large variation in insect ventilatory patterns have been documented, suggesting that insect respiration is highly variable. Some small insects do demonstrate continuous respiration and may lack muscular control of the spiracles. Others, however, utilize muscular contraction of the abdomen along with coordinated spiracle contraction and relaxation to generate cyclical gas exchange patterns and to reduce water loss into the atmosphere. The most extreme form of these patterns is termed discontinuous gas exchange cycles (DGC). Recent modeling has described the mechanism of air transport in cyclic gas exchange computationally and analytically.
