= Tracheole =

Respiratory organ of an insect or spider

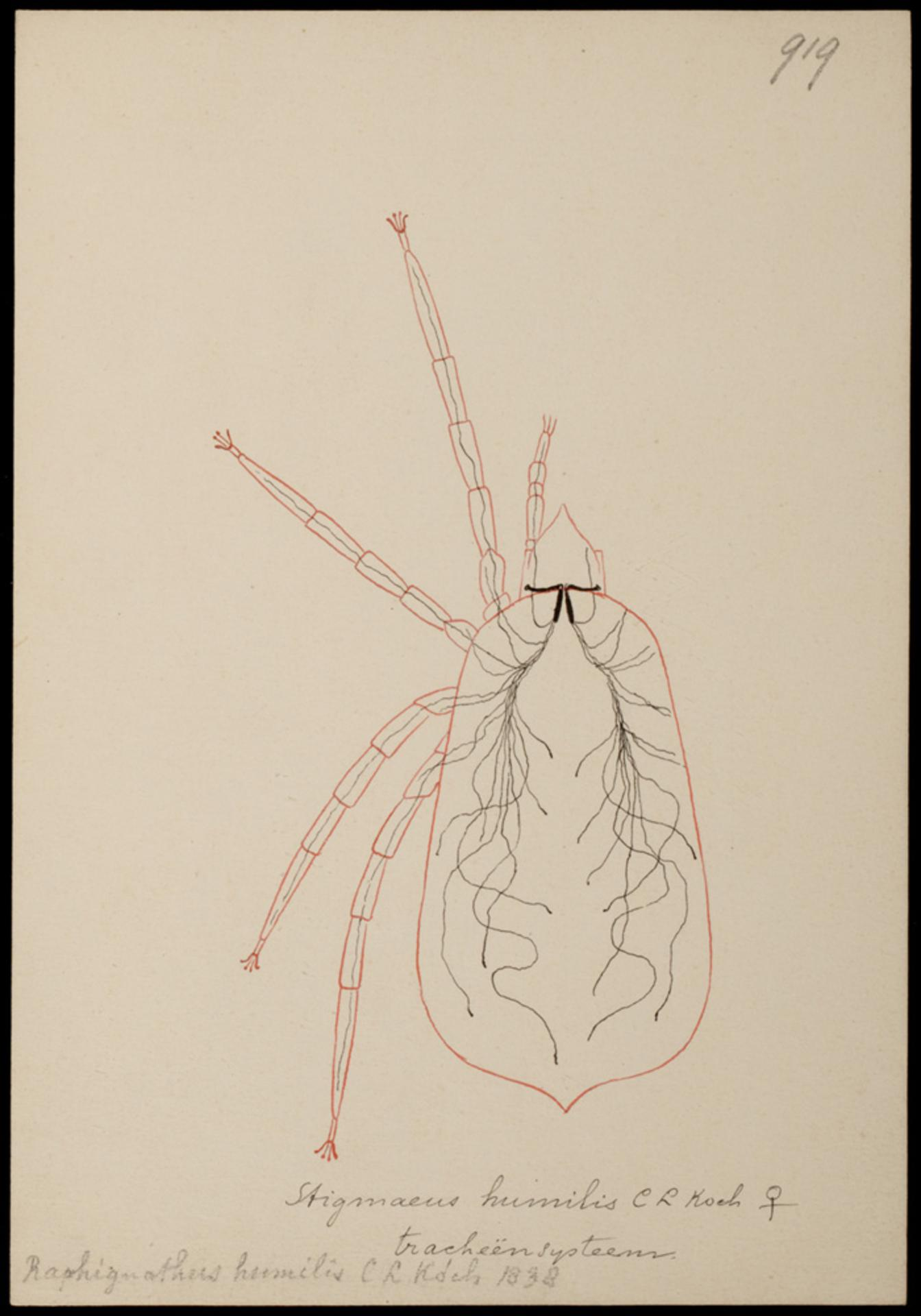
Tracheal system of the mite Stigmaeus humilis (C. L. Koch). Anthonie Cornelis Oudemans, 1913.

Tracheole (trā'kē-ōl') is a fine respiratory tube of the trachea of an insect or a spider, part of the respiratory system.

Tracheoles are about 1 μm in diameter, and they convey oxygen to cells while providing a means for carbon dioxide to escape.

Tracheoles branch from the larger tracheae (which can be several mm in diameter) much like capillaries branch from arteries, or twigs from branches of a tree. This increases the surface area for gas exchange in the insect. Areas of intense metabolic activity, such as the digestive tract and flight muscles, have very dense aggregations of tracheoles.

Though usually closely associated with cells, tracheoles physically penetrate only the flight muscle cells which have the highest oxygen demands.

Unlike the larger tracheae which are derived of ectodermal stem cells, tracheoles do not molt with the insect. Instead, they remain in place and fuse themselves to new tracheae at each molt by a cement they produce.

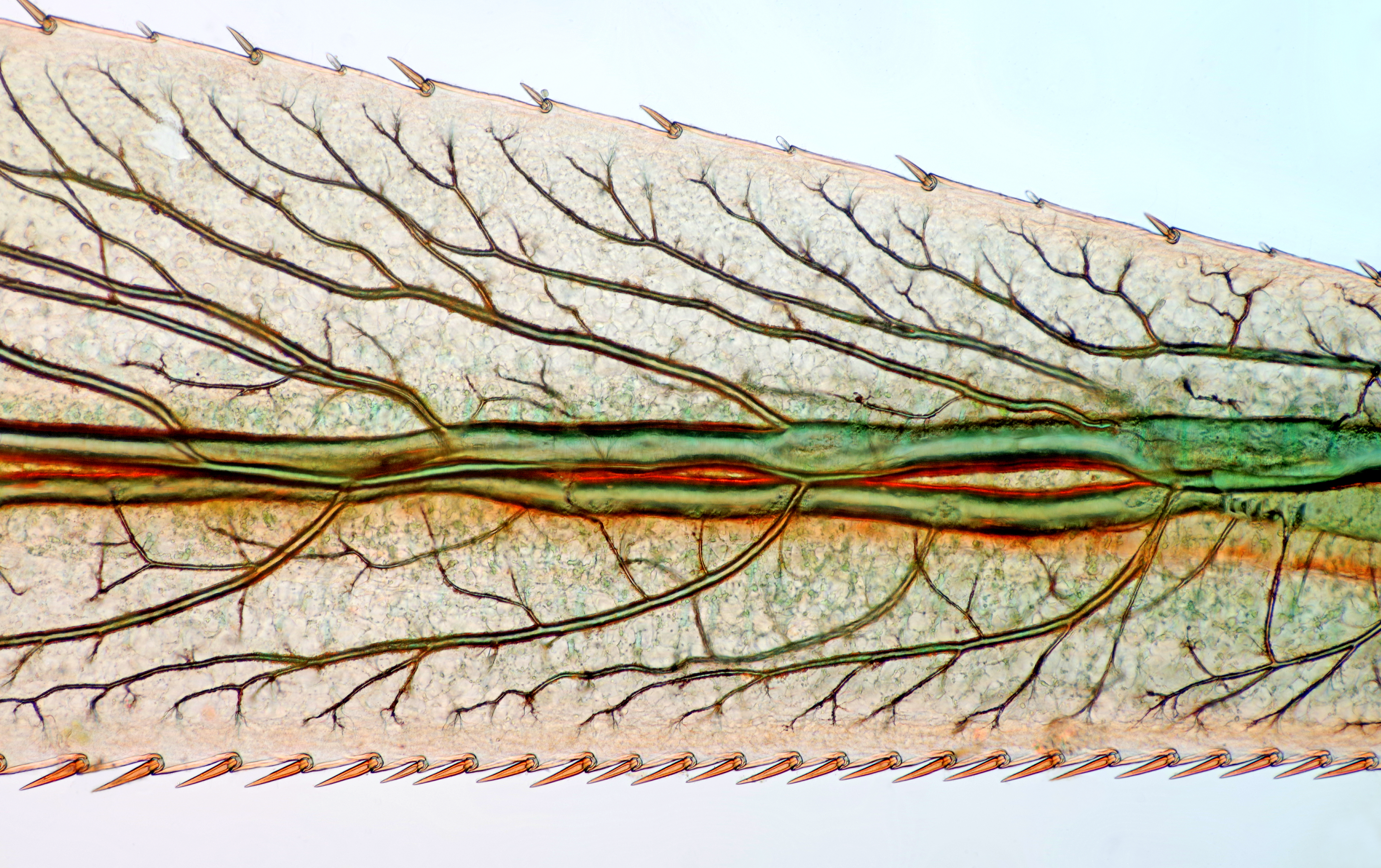
Part of a damselfly larva caudal gill. Thanks to its transparency respiratory system (tracheae and tracheoles) is visible.
