= Surgical shock =

Physiologic state of shock related to surgery

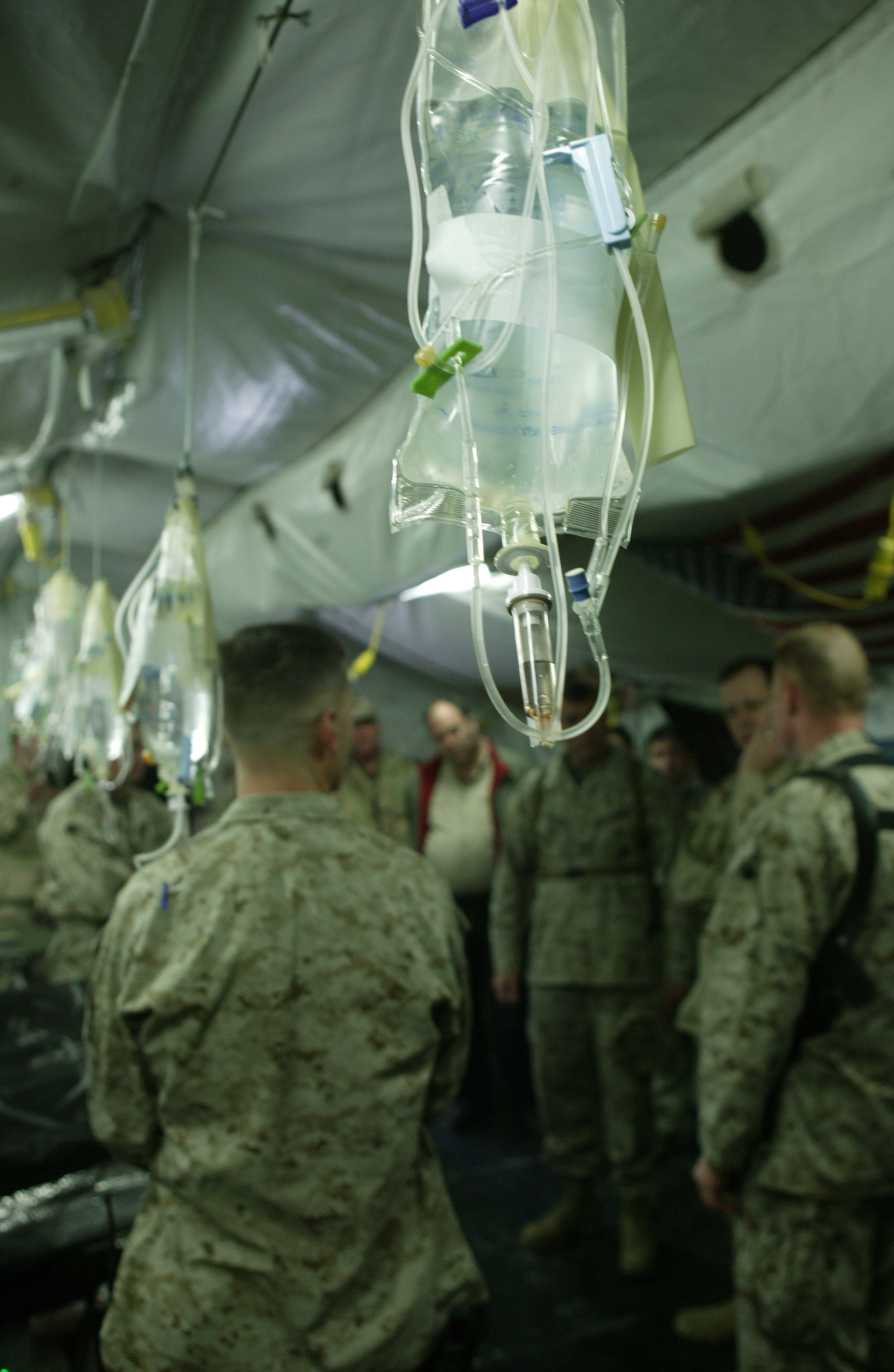
Intravenous therapy in the emergency room of the US Marine Corps' Surgical Shock Trauma Platoon

Surgical shock is a physiologic state of shock which can be related to complications of surgery or the surgery itself. Shock is defined as insufficient perfusion or blood flow to organs and body tissue that causes organ and tissue dysfunction, and can be divided into different types depending on the cause and symptoms. A common type of surgical shock is hypovolemic shock, which is often caused by blood loss. Other types of shock include cardiogenic, obstructive and distributive. Failure to identify and treat the underlying cause of shock in any setting may lead to irreversible multiple organ damage, organ failure, and death.

== Common types of shock in surgery ==
=== Hypovolemic ===
Hypovolemic shock is shock due to inadequate blood volume. A common cause of hypovolemic shock related to surgery is blood loss, but some other causes include by vomiting, diarrhea, or inflammation causing body fluid to leak out of the blood vessels and settle into tissue or lymphatics. Inadequate blood volume leads to inadequate delivery of nutrients to organs and tissues, causing suboptimal function and the clinical signs and symptoms of shock.

=== Cardiogenic ===
Cardiogenic shock is a result of failure of the heart to pump blood forward into circulation. This can be caused by mechanical failure, arrhythmia, or cardiomyopathy. Mechanical failure could result from a valve not working properly, allowing blood to flow backwards and pool in the heart, rather than be propelled forward from chamber to chamber and into the vessels as it should. Arrhythmia can cause cardiogenic shock when electrical signals are not conducted properly, causing the muscles of the heart to contract asynchronously. The heart depends on coordinated muscle contractions to push blood from chamber to chamber and into the aorta, so uncoordinated contractions decrease the ability of the heart to move blood where it needs to go. Cardiomyopathy is typically a chronic problem which occurs due to changes heart muscle that negatively affect function. It may contribute to surgical shock as an underlying issue, such as the already weakened heart not being able to continue pumping blood effectively during or after the stress of surgery.

=== Obstructive ===
Obstructive shock is shock due to obstruction of blood flow, which leads to insufficient delivery of oxygen and nutrients to organs and tissues, thereby causing dysfunction. Causes of obstructive shock include pulmonary embolism, cardiac tamponade, tension pneumothorax, and other conditions that block blood flow in arteries, such as stenosis (narrowing), embolism (blood clot or material blocking blood flow that has traveled from a different source in the body), and thrombosis (blood clot in the same location that it was formed). Blood clots are a common complication during and after surgery, sometimes leading to deep venous thrombosis and pulmonary embolism.

=== Distributive ===
Distributive shock is defined by abnormal dilation of blood vessels throughout the body, causing decreased perfusion and low blood pressure. It can be divided into multiple subcategories, including anaphylactic shock, septic shock, and neurogenic shock.

Anaphylactic shock may occur in surgical settings due to use of a drug or material that a patient has previously developed an allergy toward. Exposure to an allergen causes release of inflammatory chemicals like histamine, which lead to dysfunction of multiple organ systems and shock.

Septic shock may occur in surgical settings due to underlying infection. In many cases, surgery is avoided in the setting of active infection, but may be necessary in certain conditions that require debridement or removal of infected or dead tissue to promote healing. For example, diverticulitis, an inflammatory condition of the large bowel which can lead to intraperitoneal infection or peritonitis, may require the diseased part of bowel to be urgently removed to prevent complications or worsening of the condition.

Neurogenic shock occurs due to spinal cord injury, which leads to inability to balance signals from the autonomic nervous system to maintain ideal blood pressure and other vital signs. Blood flowing through vessels in the body follows Poiseuille's Law, meaning that the flow of fluid depends on a number of factors such as tube length, fluid viscosity, etc.. One important factor in blood flow rate is vessel diameter, which is controlled by the autonomic nervous system. In a healthy individual, signals from the autonomic nervous system tighten or relax muscles in the wall of blood vessels to change their diameter, and by doing so, either speed up or slow down blood flow through that specific vessel. In a spinal cord injury, some of the signals can no longer reach their targets since the path to get there has been disconnected. In neurogenic shock, the signals needed to tighten vessels are ineffective, which causes widespread dilation of blood vessels and a drop in systemic blood pressure, leading to decreased perfusion and shock.

== Diagnosis ==
Shock is a clinical diagnosis, meaning it is diagnosed based on observations of a medical provider based on patient symptoms physical examination. Shock can be either compensated or decompensated. Compensated shock means that the body is successfully working harder than normal to meet the body's needs for blood flow and perfusion of tissues. Clinical signs and symptoms of shock may be more difficult to identify in compensated shock as the body is functioning close to normal with only minor changes in vital signs despite significant stress. The heart may beat faster and harder to maintain normal circulation of blood in the setting of compensated hypovolemic shock, so a patient may have a normal blood pressure and only mildly elevated heart rate. Compensated shock requires fast identification and action by the medical team to prevent decompensation. Decompensated shock occurs when the body is unable to adequately adjust to maintain relatively normal function in the setting of shock. Clinical signs and symptoms are more severe and recognizable when shock becomes decompensated. In decompensated hypovolemic shock, a person's blood pressure will begin to drop below normal levels, their heart rate will continue to increase, and they will likely start to show signs that their organs are not getting adequate blood flow. In decompensated shock, a patient may experience confusion and/or loss of consciousness when their brain is not getting enough oxygen from blood flow. When organs are not getting enough blood flow, they can no longer function normally. For example, when kidneys are unable to function, a patient may urinate much less than normal, or they may stop making urine altogether until blood flow sufficient for normal function is restored. Each of these signs and symptoms act as clues to help medical providers understand and diagnose shock, allowing them to promptly treat the underlying cause.

== Treatment ==
Treatment of surgical shock, and shock in general, depends on the underlying cause. Regardless of the cause, the goal of treatment is to restore perfusion of tissues. Some treatments include intravenous (IV) fluids, control of bleeding, transfusion of blood products, medications that help the heart beat more effectively (inotropes), and medications to increase blood pressure (pressors). Medical providers use clinical context, medical history, and observation of signs and symptoms to diagnose shock, identify the underlying cause, and choose appropriate treatments to prevent complications of shock such as multiple organ failure and death.
