= Complete breathing =

Form of yogic breathing exercise

Complete breathing is a form of yogic breathing exercise. It is a form of diaphragmatic breathing and is the most basic of yogic breathing exercises.

Deep abdominal breathing

== Costal breathing ==
Costal breathing is the inhalation by lateral expansion of the ribs, using the external intercostal muscle to lift the costals to enlarge the thorax. Moreover, the shoulders are lifted when breathing, and the breath is inhaled shallowly, so it is also called shoulder breathing, clavicle breathing or high chest breathing. Only the upper part of the lung, the alveoli, is working. The alveoli in the middle and lower lobes, which comprise four-fifths of the lung, are resting.

== Clavicular breathing ==
Clavicular breathing is the final stage of the overall chest expansion. It happens after the chest inhalation is complete. To get more air into the lungs, the upper ribs and collarbones are pulled upward by the neck, larynx and sternum muscles. This requires maximum chest expansion during inhalation, and only the upper lobe of the lung is involved in air exchange.

== See also ==
- Pranayama, the yogic practice of focusing on breath
