= Neurogenic shock =

Insufficient blood flow due to autonomic nervous system damage

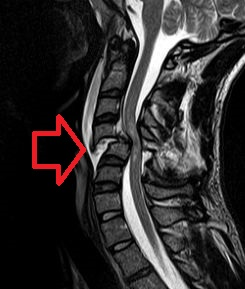
- Cervical spine MRI of a patient with SCI: C4 fracture and dislocation, spinal cord compression
- Specialty: Neurology

Neurogenic shock is a distributive type of shock resulting in hypotension (low blood pressure), often with bradycardia (slowed heart rate), caused by disruption of autonomic nervous system pathways. It can occur after damage to the central nervous system, such as spinal cord injury and traumatic brain injury. Low blood pressure occurs due to decreased systemic vascular resistance resulting from loss of sympathetic tone, which in turn causes blood pooling within the extremities rather than being available to circulate throughout the body. The slowed heart rate results from a vagal response unopposed by a sympathetic nervous system (SNS) response. Such cardiovascular instability is exacerbated by hypoxia, or treatment with endotracheal or endobronchial suction used to prevent pulmonary aspiration.

Neurogenic shock is a potentially devastating complication, leading to organ dysfunction and death if not promptly recognized and treated.

It is not to be confused with spinal shock, which is not circulatory in nature.

== Signs and symptoms ==
- Instantaneous hypotension due to sudden, massive vasodilation and decrease in blood oxygen saturation
- Warm, flushed skin due to vasodilation and inability to constrict blood vessels.
- Priapism, also due to vasodilation
- The patient will be unable to mount a tachycardic response, and often becomes bradycardic
- If the injury is below cervical vertebrae C5, the patient will exhibit diaphragmatic breathing due to loss of nervous control of the intercostal muscles (which are required for thoracic breathing).
- If the injury is above C3, the patient will go into respiratory arrest immediately following the injury, due to loss of nervous control of the diaphragm.

== Causes ==
Neurogenic shock can result from severe central nervous system damage (brain injury, cervical or high thoracic spinal cord). In simple terms, the trauma causes a sudden loss of background SNS stimulation to the blood vessels. This causes them to relax (vasodilation) resulting in a sudden decrease in blood pressure (secondary to a decrease in peripheral vascular resistance).

Neurogenic shock results from damage to the spinal cord above the level of the 6th thoracic vertebra. It is found in about half of people who have a spinal cord injury within the first 24 hours, and usually persists for one to three weeks.

Neurogenic shock may be caused by severe brain injury. However, in case of increased intracranial pressure, according to the Cushing triad, blood pressure will be increased (unless decreased from hypovolemia), respirations will be irregular and bradycardia will also be a feature. In rare cases, it may also occur as an adverse effect of spinal anaesthesia, with Guillain–Barré syndrome, toxins affecting the spinal cord, transverse myelitis and various neuropathies of the upper thoracic and cervical spinal cord as examples of other rare causes.

== Pathophysiology ==
Neurogenic shock is diagnosed based on a person's symptoms and blood pressure levels.

Neurogenic shock's presentation includes:

- Warm and pink skin
- Labored breathing
- Low blood pressure
- Dizziness
- Anxiety
- History of trauma to head or upper spine
- If the injury is to the head or neck, hoarseness or difficulty swallowing may occur.

Symptoms of neurogenic shock are differentiated from other forms of shock by the lack of signs of the compensatory mechanisms triggered by the SNS, usual in other forms of shock. 'This SNS response is effected via release of epinephrine and norepinephrine, and signs of these neurotransmitters' activity are typically absent where shock is of neurogenic origin. Those signs - in non-neurogenic shock - would include: tachycardia (increased heart rate), tachypnea (increased breath rate), sweating, and adaptive vasoconstriction, which serves in other forms of shock to shunt blood away from the extremities and to the vital organs.

In neurogenic shock, the body loses its ability to activate the SNS so that only parasympathetic tone remains. The resulting loss of sympathetic tone, which plays a major role in other forms of shock, is responsible for the unique and atypical features mentioned above.

== Treatment ==
- Dopamine (Intropin) is often used in combination with other vasopressors. Dopamine is not the best first-line vasopressor as it increases the chance of arrhythmias.
- Vasopressin (antidiuretic hormone, ADH) is another vasopressor often used in combination with norepinephrine
- Certain vasopressors (ephedrine, norepinephrine). Norepinephrine (Levophed) is the most common first-line vasopressor for people who don't respond well to other hypotension treatments such as fluid resuscitation.
- Atropine is administered for bradycardia. It acts on the vagus nerve so it's not effective in heart transplant patients as the vagus nerve is severed during the transplant.
