= Breathing =

Process of moving air in and out of the lungs

Real-time magnetic resonance imaging of the human thorax during breathing

X-ray video of a female American alligator while breathing

Breathing (respiring or ventilating) is the rhythmic process of inhaling air into the lungs providing oxygen, and exhaling the air removing carbon dioxide, in the gas exchange process.

All aerobic organisms require oxygen for cellular respiration, which extracts energy from food and produces carbon dioxide as a waste product. External respiration (breathing) brings air to the alveoli where gases move by diffusion; the circulatory system then transports oxygen and carbon dioxide between the lungs and the tissues.

In vertebrates with lungs, breathing consists of repeated cycles of inhalation and exhalation through a branched system of airways that conduct air from the nose or mouth to the alveoli. The number of respiratory cycles per minute — the respiratory or breathing rate — is a primary vital sign. Under normal conditions, depth and rate of breathing are controlled unconsciously by homeostatic mechanisms that maintain arterial partial pressures of carbon dioxide and oxygen. Keeping arterial CO₂ stable helps maintain extracellular fluid pH; hyperventilation and hypoventilation alter CO₂ and thus pH and produce distressing symptoms.

Breathing also supports speech, laughter and certain reflexes (yawning, coughing, sneezing) and can contribute to thermoregulation (for example, panting in animals that cannot sweat sufficiently).

== Mechanics ==
The "pump handle" and "bucket handle movements" of the ribs

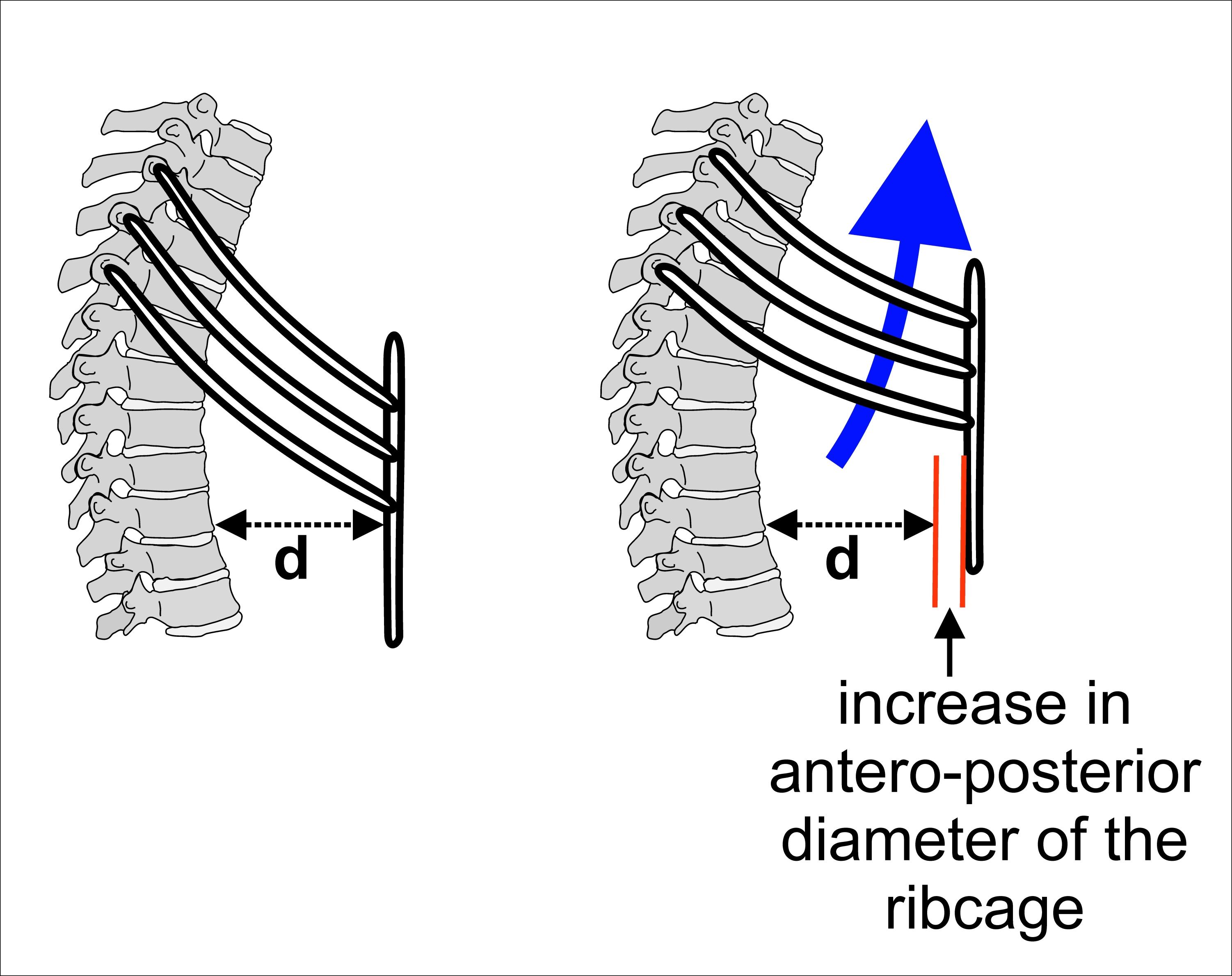
The effect of the muscles of inhalation in expanding the rib cage. The particular action illustrated here is called the pump handle movement of the rib cage.

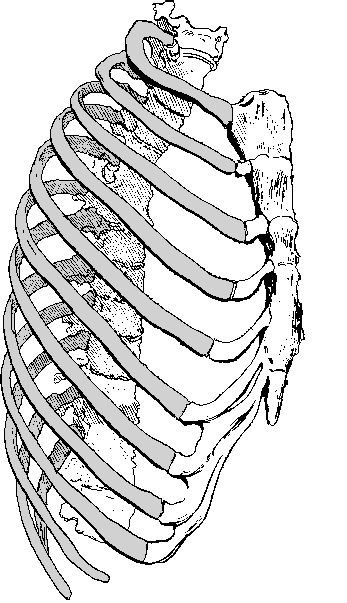
In this view of the rib cage the downward slope of the lower ribs from the midline outwards can be clearly seen. This allows a movement similar to the "pump handle effect", but in this case, it is called the bucket handle movement.

Breathing

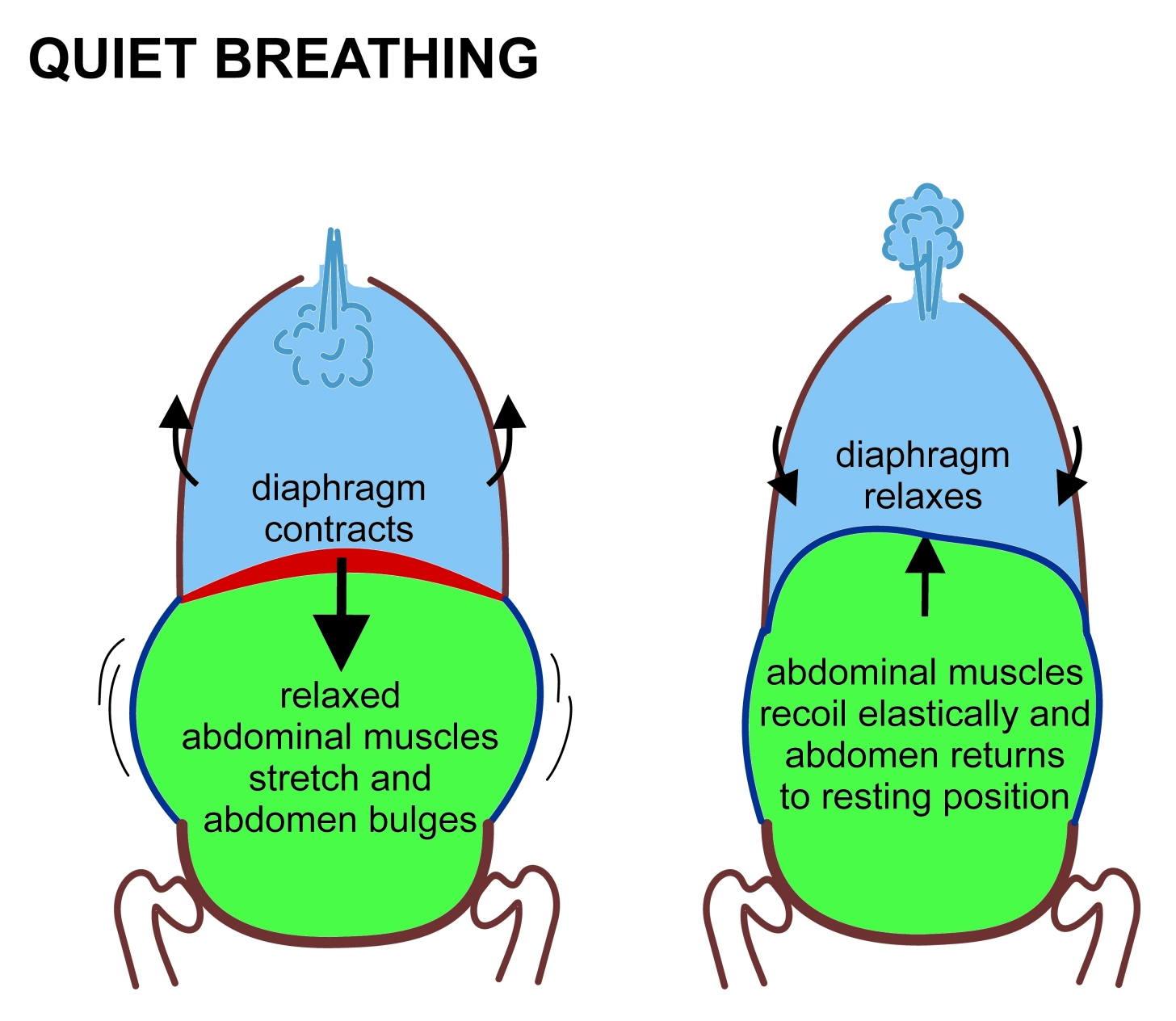
The muscles of breathing at rest: inhalation on the left, exhalation on the right. Contracting muscles are shown in red; relaxed muscles in blue. Contraction of the diaphragm generally contributes the most to the expansion of the chest cavity (light blue). However, at the same time, the intercostal muscles pull the ribs upwards (their effect is indicated by arrows) also causing the rib cage to expand during inhalation (see diagram on another side of the page). The relaxation of all these muscles during exhalation causes the rib cage and abdomen (light green) to elastically return to their resting positions. Compare these diagrams with the MRI video at the top of the page.

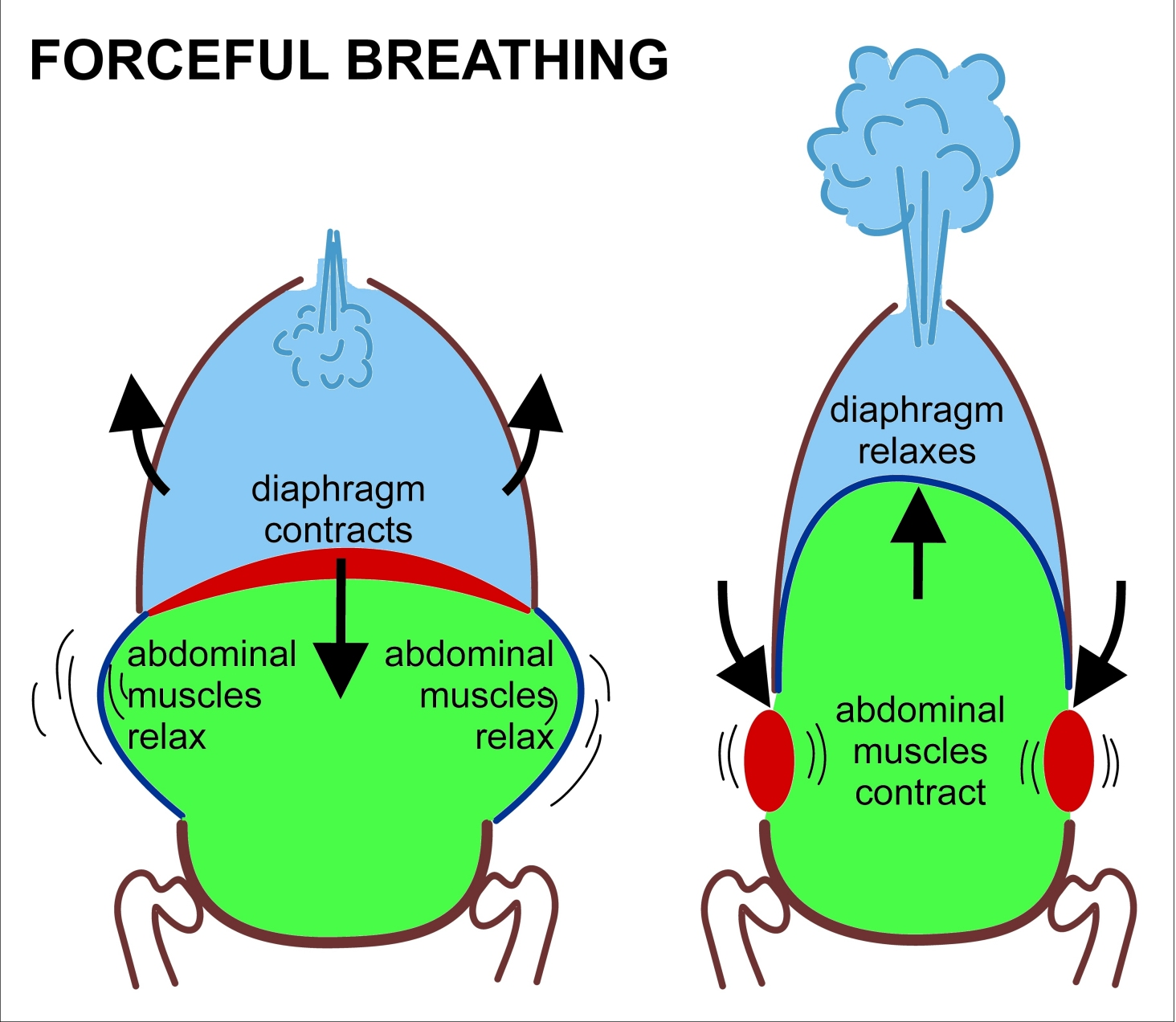
The muscles of forceful breathing (inhalation and exhalation). The color code is the same as on the RIGHT . In addition to a more forceful and extensive contraction of the diaphragm, the intercostal muscles are aided by the accessory muscles of inhalation to exaggerate the movement of the ribs upwards, causing a greater expansion of the rib cage. During exhalation, apart from the relaxation of the muscles of inhalation, the abdominal muscles actively contract to pull the lower edges of the rib cage downwards decreasing the volume of the rib cage, while at the same time pushing the diaphragm upwards deep into the thorax.

The lungs do not inflate themselves; they expand only when the thoracic cavity volume increases. In mammals this expansion is produced mainly by contraction of the diaphragm and, to a lesser extent, by contraction of the intercostal muscles, which lift the rib cage. During forceful inhalation accessory muscles may augment the pump-handle and bucket-handle movements of the ribs to further increase chest volume. At rest exhalation is largely passive as inhalatory muscles relax and the elastic recoil of the lungs and chest wall returns the chest to its resting position. At this resting point the lungs contain the functional residual capacity(about 2.5–3.0 L in an adult human).

During heavy breathing (hyperpnea), such as with exercise, exhalation also involves active contraction of the abdominal muscles, which pushes the diaphragm upward and reduces end-exhalatory lung volume. Even at maximum exhalation a normal mammal retains residual air in the lungs.

Diaphragmatic (or abdominal) breathing produces visible abdominal movement; use of accessory muscles with clavicular elevation is seen in labored breathing, for example during severe asthma or chronic obstructive pulmonary disease (COPD) exacerbations.

== Passage of air ==
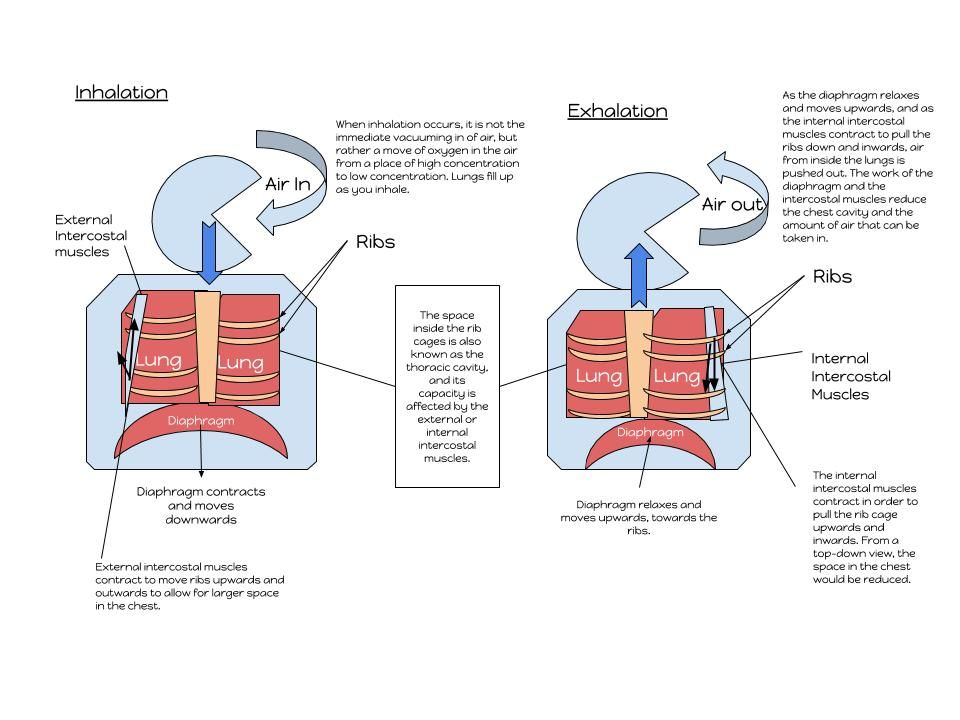
This is a diagram showing how inhalation and exhalation is controlled by a variety of muscles, and what that looks like from a general overall view.

=== Upper airways ===
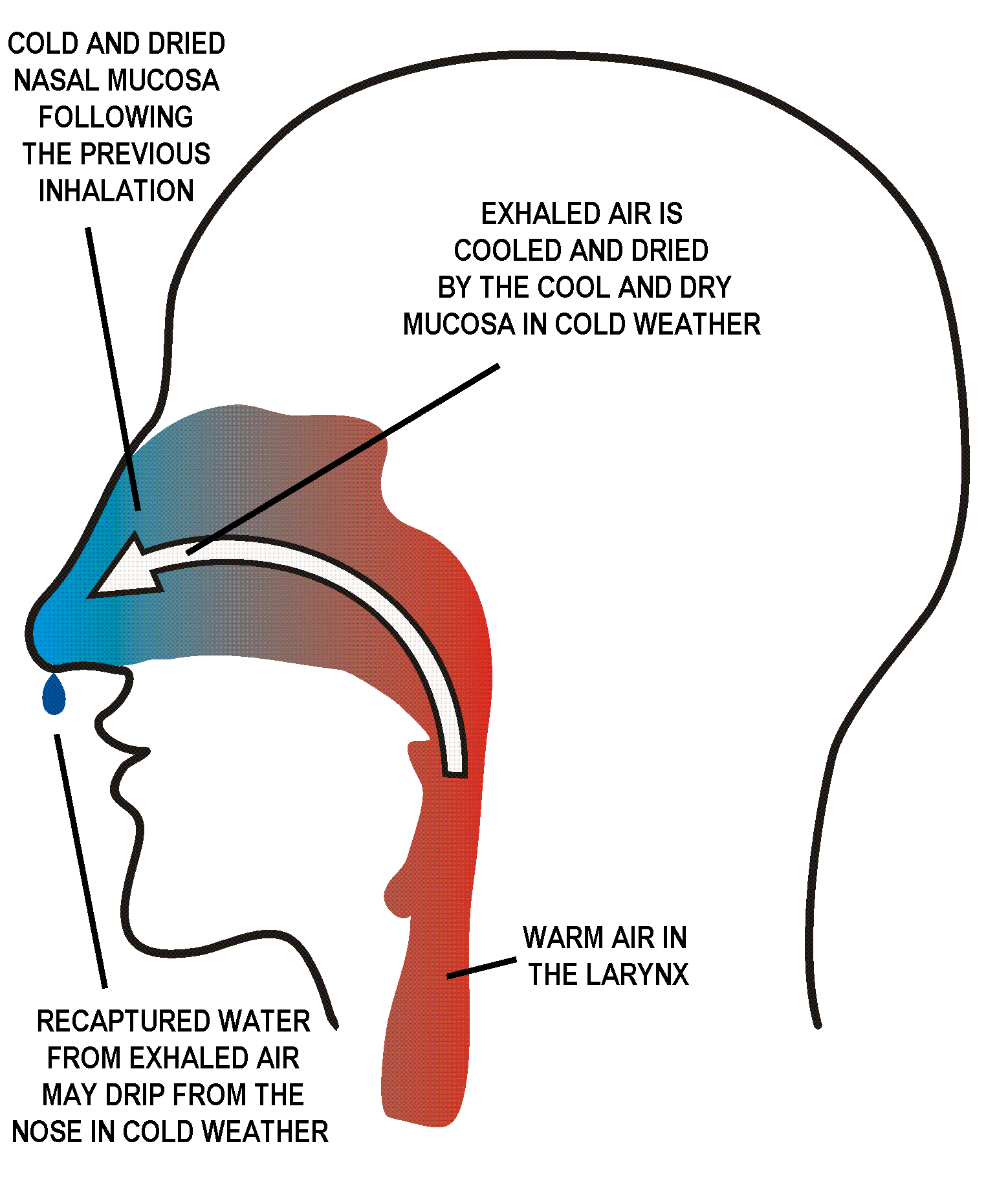
Inhaled air is warmed and moistened by the wet, warm nasal mucosa, which consequently cools and dries. When warm, wet air from the lungs is breathed out through the nose, the cold hygroscopic mucus in the cool and dry nose re-captures some of the warmth and moisture from that exhaled air. In very cold weather the re-captured water may cause a "dripping nose".

Air is ideally inhaled and exhaled through the nose. The nasal cavities — divided by the nasal septum and lined with convoluted conchae — expose inhaled air to a large mucosal surface so it is warmed and humidified and particulate matter is trapped by mucus before reaching the lower airways. Some of the heat and moisture are recovered during exhalation when air passes back over cooler, partially dried mucus.

=== Lower airways ===
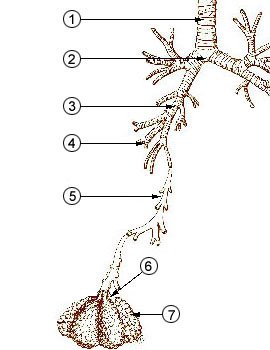
The lower airways: 1. Trachea; 2. Mainstem bronchus; 3. Lobar bronchus; 4. Segmental bronchus; 5. Bronchiole; 6. Alveolar duct; 7. Alveolus

Below the upper airways the mammalian respiratory system is commonly described as a respiratory or tracheobronchial tree. Larger conducting airways branch repeatedly into smaller bronchi and bronchioles; in humans there are on average about 23 branching generations. Proximal divisions transmit air, while terminal divisions (respiratory bronchioles, alveolar ducts and alveoli) are specialized for gas exchange. The trachea and major bronchi begin outside the lungs and most branching occurs within the lungs until the blind-ended alveoli are reached. This arrangement produces anatomical dead space — the volume of conducting airways (about 150 ml in an adult) that does not participate in gas exchange.

== Gas exchange ==
The primary purpose of breathing is to refresh alveolar air so gas exchange between alveolar air and pulmonary capillary blood can occur by diffusion. This diffusion of gases occurs through the utilization of the thin respiratory membrane, which is composed of alveolar epithelium, capillary endothelium and the basement membrane that come together to form a blood-gas barrier. After exhalation the lungs still contain the functional residual capacity; on a typical inhalation only a relatively small volume of new atmospheric air mixes with the FRC, so alveolar gas composition remains fairly constant across breaths. Pulmonary capillary blood therefore equilibrates with a relatively steady alveolar gas composition, and peripheral and central chemoreceptors sense gradual changes in dissolved gases rather than rapid swings. Homeostatic control of breathing thus centers on arterial partial pressures of CO₂ and O₂ and on maintaining blood pH.

== Control ==
Breathing rate and depth are regulated by respiratory centers in the brainstem that receive input from central and peripheral chemoreceptors. Central chemoreceptors in the medulla are particularly sensitive to the pH of the blood (which is affected by CO₂) and cerebrospinal fluid; peripheral chemoreceptors in the aortic and carotid bodies are sensitive primarily to arterial O₂. Information from these receptors is integrated in the pons and medulla, which adjust ventilation to restore blood gas tensions (for example, returning arterial CO₂ toward normal during exercise). Motor nerves, including the phrenic nerves to the diaphragm, convey respiratory center outputs to the muscles of breathing. Although breathing is primarily automatic, it can be voluntarily modified for speaking, singing, swimming, or breath-holding training; conscious breathing techniques may promote relaxation. Reflexes such as the diving reflex alter breathing and circulation during submersion to conserve oxygen.

== Composition ==
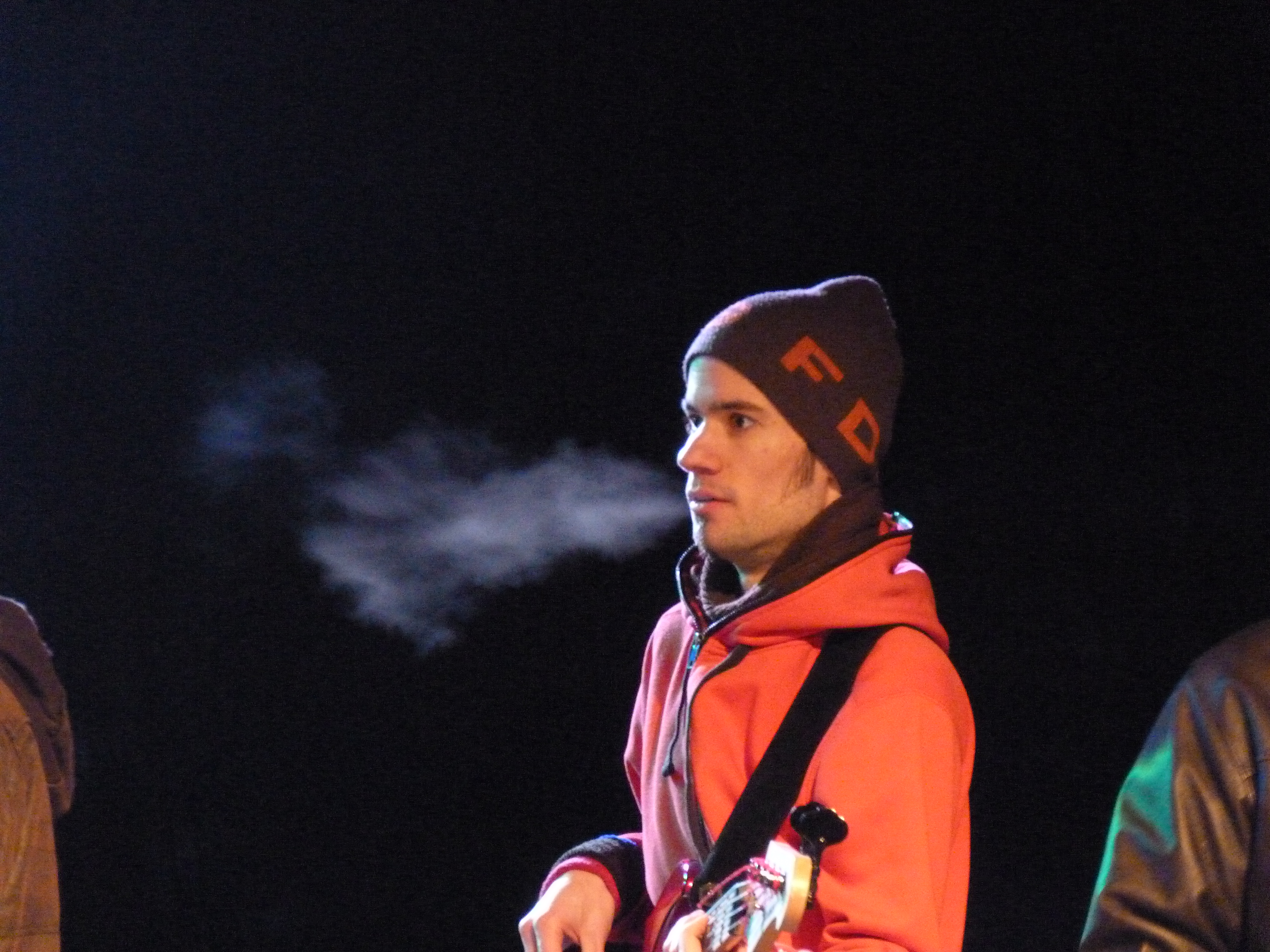
Following on from the above diagram, if the exhaled air is breathed out through the mouth in cold and humid conditions, the water vapor will condense into a visible cloud or mist.

Inhaled air is by volume 78% nitrogen, 20.95% oxygen and small amounts of other gases including argon, carbon dioxide, neon, helium, and hydrogen.

The gas exhaled is 4% to 5% by volume of carbon dioxide, about a hundredfold increase over the inhaled amount. The volume of oxygen is reduced by about a quarter, 4% to 5%, of total air volume. The typical composition is:

- 5.0–6.3% water vapor
- 79% nitrogen
- 13.6–16.0% oxygen
- 4.0–5.3% carbon dioxide
- 1% argon
- parts per million (ppm) of hydrogen, from the metabolic activity of microorganisms in the large intestine.
- ppm of carbon monoxide from degradation of heme proteins.
- 4.5 ppm of methanol
- 1 ppm of ammonia.
- Trace many hundreds of volatile organic compounds, especially isoprene and acetone. The presence of certain organic compounds indicates disease.

In addition to air, underwater divers practicing technical diving may breathe oxygen-rich, oxygen-depleted or helium-rich breathing gas mixtures. Oxygen and analgesic gases are sometimes given to patients under medical care. The atmosphere in space suits is pure oxygen. However, this is kept at around 20% of Earthbound atmospheric pressure to regulate the rate of inspiration.

== Effects of ambient air pressure ==
=== Breathing at altitude ===
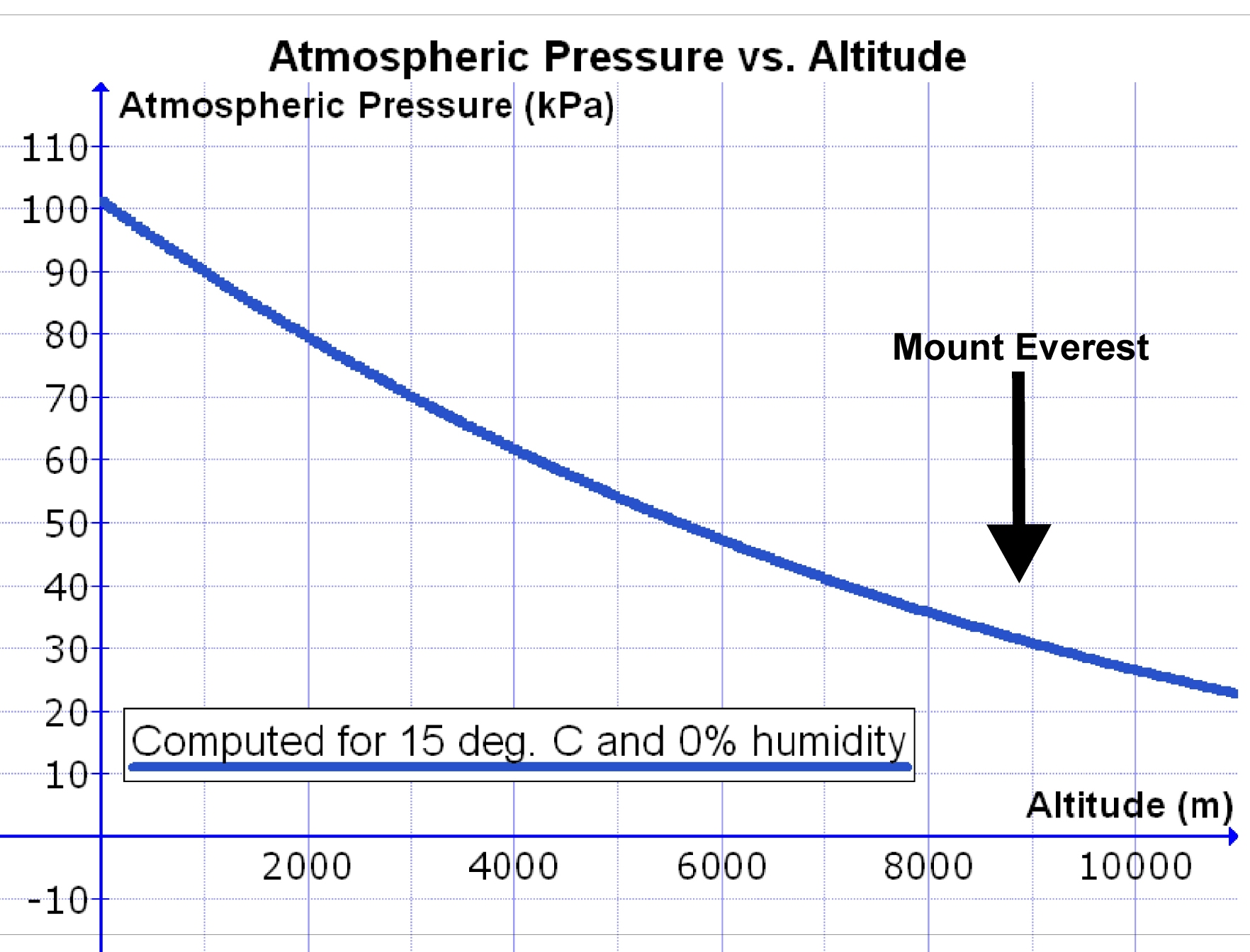
Fig. 4 Atmospheric pressure

Atmospheric pressure decreases with the height above sea level (altitude) and since the alveoli are open to the outside air through the open airways, the pressure in the lungs also decreases at the same rate with altitude. At altitude, a pressure differential is still required to drive air into and out of the lungs as it is at sea level. The mechanism for breathing at altitude is essentially identical to breathing at sea level but with the following differences:

The atmospheric pressure decreases exponentially with altitude, roughly halving with every 5,500 metres (18,000 ft) rise in altitude. The composition of atmospheric air is, however, almost constant below 80 km, as a result of the continuous mixing effect of the weather. The concentration of oxygen in the air (mmols O_{2} per liter of air) therefore decreases at the same rate as the atmospheric pressure. At sea level, where the ambient pressure is about 100 kPa, oxygen constitutes 21% of the atmosphere and the partial pressure of oxygen (P_{O_{2}}) is 21 kPa (i.e. 21% of 100 kPa). At the summit of Mount Everest, 8,848 metres (29,029 ft), where the total atmospheric pressure is 33.7 kPa, oxygen still constitutes 21% of the atmosphere but its partial pressure is only 7.1 kPa (i.e. 21% of 33.7 kPa = 7.1 kPa). Therefore, a greater volume of air must be inhaled at altitude than at sea level in order to breathe in the same amount of oxygen in a given period.

During inhalation, air is warmed and saturated with water vapor as it passes through the nose and pharynx before it enters the alveoli. The saturated vapor pressure of water is dependent only on temperature; at a body core temperature of 37 °C it is 6.3 kPa (47.0 mmHg), regardless of any other influences, including altitude. Consequently, at sea level, the tracheal air (immediately before the inhaled air enters the alveoli) consists of: water vapor (P_{H_{2}O} = 6.3 kPa), nitrogen (P_{N_{2}} = 74.0 kPa), oxygen (P_{O_{2}} = 19.7 kPa) and trace amounts of carbon dioxide and other gases, a total of 100 kPa. In dry air, the P_{O_{2}} at sea level is 21.0 kPa, compared to a P_{O_{2}} of 19.7 kPa in the tracheal air (21% of [100 – 6.3] = 19.7 kPa). At the summit of Mount Everest tracheal air has a total pressure of 33.7 kPa, of which 6.3 kPa is water vapor, reducing the P_{O_{2}} in the tracheal air to 5.8 kPa (21% of [33.7 – 6.3] = 5.8 kPa), beyond what is accounted for by a reduction of atmospheric pressure alone (7.1 kPa).

The pressure gradient forcing air into the lungs during inhalation is also reduced by altitude. Doubling the volume of the lungs halves the pressure in the lungs at any altitude. Halving the sea level air pressure (100 kPa) results in a pressure gradient of 50 kPa but doing the same at 5500 m, where the atmospheric pressure is 50 kPa, a doubling of the volume of the lungs results in a pressure gradient of the only 25 kPa. In practice, because we breathe in a gentle, cyclical manner that generates pressure gradients of only 2–3 kPa, this has little effect on the actual rate of inflow into the lungs and is easily compensated for by breathing slightly deeper. The lower viscosity of air at altitude allows air to flow more easily and this also helps compensate for any loss of pressure gradient.

All of the above effects of low atmospheric pressure on breathing are normally accommodated by increasing the respiratory minute volume (the volume of air breathed in — or out — per minute), and the mechanism for doing this is automatic. The exact increase required is determined by the respiratory gases homeostatic mechanism, which regulates the arterial P_{O_{2}} and P_{CO_{2}}. This homeostatic mechanism prioritizes the regulation of the arterial P_{CO_{2}} over that of oxygen at sea level. That is to say, at sea level the arterial P_{CO_{2}} is maintained at very close to 5.3 kPa (or 40 mmHg) under a wide range of circumstances, at the expense of the arterial P_{O_{2}}, which is allowed to vary within a very wide range of values, before eliciting a corrective ventilatory response. However, when the atmospheric pressure (and therefore the atmospheric P_{O_{2}}) falls to below 75% of its value at sea level, oxygen homeostasis is given priority over carbon dioxide homeostasis. This switch-over occurs at an elevation of about 2,500 metres (8,200 ft). If this switch occurs relatively abruptly, the hyperventilation at high altitude will cause a severe fall in the arterial P_{CO_{2}} with a consequent rise in the pH of the arterial plasma leading to respiratory alkalosis. This is one contributor to high altitude sickness. On the other hand, if the switch to oxygen homeostasis is incomplete, then hypoxia may complicate the clinical picture with potentially fatal results.

=== Breathing at depth ===
Typical breathing effort when breathing through a diving regulator

Pressure increases with the depth of water at the rate of about one atmosphere – slightly more than 100 kPa, or one bar, for every 10 meters. Air breathed underwater by divers is at the ambient pressure of the surrounding water and this has a complex range of physiological and biochemical implications. If not properly managed, breathing compressed gasses underwater may lead to several diving disorders which include pulmonary barotrauma, decompression sickness, nitrogen narcosis, and oxygen toxicity. The effects of breathing gasses under pressure are further complicated by the use of one or more special gas mixtures.

Air is provided by a diving regulator, which reduces the high pressure in a diving cylinder to the ambient pressure. The breathing performance of regulators is a factor when choosing a suitable regulator for the type of diving to be undertaken. It is desirable that breathing from a regulator requires low effort even when supplying large amounts of air. It is also recommended that it supplies air smoothly without any sudden changes in resistance while inhaling or exhaling. In the graph, right, note the initial spike in pressure on exhaling to open the exhaust valve and that the initial drop in pressure on inhaling is soon overcome as the Venturi effect designed into the regulator to allow an easy draw of air. Many regulators have an adjustment to change the ease of inhaling so that breathing is effortless.

== Respiratory disorders ==
Breathing patterns
- Graph showing normal as well as different kinds of pathological breathing patterns

Abnormal breathing patterns include Kussmaul breathing, Biot's respiration and Cheyne–Stokes respiration.

Other breathing disorders include shortness of breath (dyspnea), stridor, apnea, sleep apnea (most commonly obstructive sleep apnea), mouth breathing, and snoring. Many conditions are associated with obstructed airways. Chronic mouth breathing may be associated with illness. Hypopnea refers to overly shallow breathing; hyperpnea refers to fast and deep breathing brought on by a demand for more oxygen, as for example by exercise. The terms hypoventilation and hyperventilation also refer to shallow breathing and fast and deep breathing respectively, but under inappropriate circumstances or disease. However, this distinction (between, for instance, hyperpnea and hyperventilation) is not always adhered to, so that these terms are frequently used interchangeably.

A range of breath tests can be used to diagnose diseases such as dietary intolerances. A rhinomanometer uses acoustic technology to examine the air flow through the nasal passages.

== Society and culture ==
The word "spirit" comes from the Latin spiritus, meaning breath. Historically, breath has often been considered in terms of the concept of life force. The Hebrew Bible refers to God breathing the breath of life into clay to make Adam a living soul (nephesh). It also refers to the breath as returning to God when a mortal dies. The terms spirit, prana, the Polynesian mana, the Hebrew ruach and the psyche in psychology are related to the concept of breath.

In tai chi, aerobic exercise is combined with breathing exercises to strengthen the diaphragm muscles, improve posture and make better use of the body's qi. Different forms of meditation, and yoga advocate various breathing methods. A form of Buddhist meditation called anapanasati meaning mindfulness of breath was first introduced by Buddha. Breathing disciplines are incorporated into meditation, certain forms of yoga such as pranayama, and the Buteyko method as a treatment for asthma and other conditions.

In music, some wind instrument players use a technique called circular breathing. Singers also rely on breath control.

Common cultural expressions related to breathing include: "to catch my breath", "took my breath away", "inspiration", "to expire", "get my breath back".

=== Breathing and mood ===
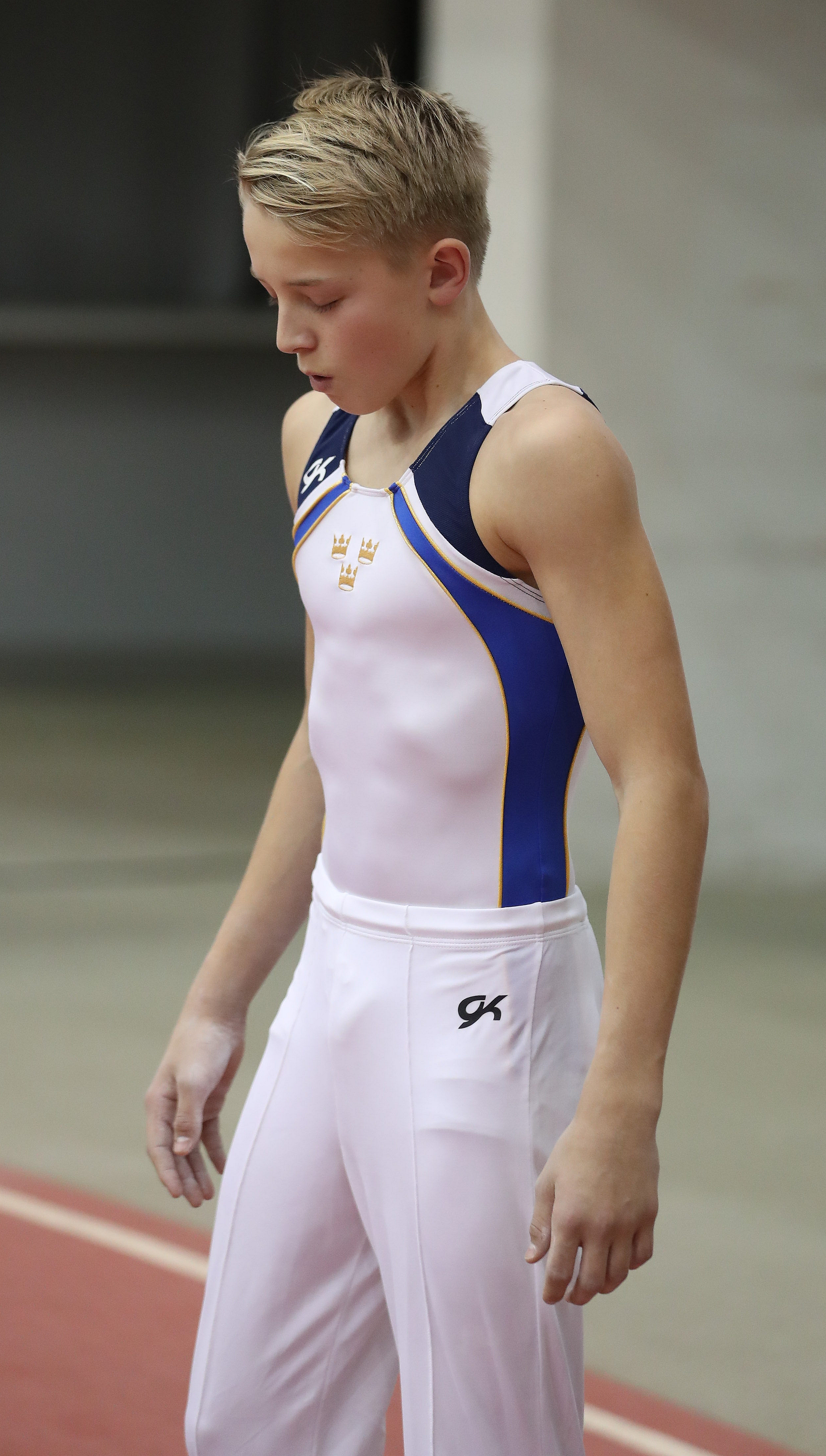
A young gymnast breathes deeply before performing his exercise.

Certain breathing patterns have a tendency to occur with certain moods. Due to this relationship, practitioners of various disciplines claim that they can encourage the occurrence of a particular mood by adopting the breathing pattern that it most commonly occurs in conjunction with. For instance, and perhaps the most common recommendation is that deeper breathing which utilises the diaphragm and abdomen more can encourage relaxation. Practitioners of different disciplines often interpret the importance of breathing regulation and its perceived influence on mood in different ways. Buddhists may consider that it helps precipitate a sense of inner peace, holistic healers that it encourages an overall state of health and business advisers that it provides relief from work-based stress.

=== Breathing and physical exercise ===
During physical exercise, a deeper breathing pattern is adapted to facilitate greater oxygen absorption. An additional reason for the adoption of a deeper breathing pattern is to strengthen the body's core. During the process of deep breathing, the thoracic diaphragm adopts a lower position in the core and this helps to generate intra-abdominal pressure which strengthens the lumbar spine. Typically, this allows for more powerful physical movements to be performed. As such, it is frequently recommended when lifting heavy weights to take a deep breath or adopt a deeper breathing pattern.

== See also ==
- Agonal respiration – Emergent abnormal pattern of breathing
- Ataxic respiration – Abnormal pattern of breathing (also known as Biot's respirations)
- Bad breath – Presence of unpleasant odors in exhaled breath
- Breath gas analysis
- Breathing gas – Gas used for human respiration
- Carbon cycle – Natural processes of carbon exchange
- Central sleep apnea – Sleep-related disorder in which the effort to breathe is diminished
- Eupnea – Natural, comfortable form of breathing in mammals
- Liquid breathing – Respiration of oxygen-rich liquid by a normally air-breathing organism
- Mouth breathing – Breathing method in humans
- Nasal cycle – Subconscious alternation of the nasal cavities
- Nitrogen washout – Test for measuring anatomic dead space in the lung during a respiratory cycle
- Obligate nasal breathing
- Respiratory adaptation – Breathing changes caused by exertion
