= Hyporeflexia =

Reduction or absence of bodily reflexes

- Other names: Hypo-reflexia, areflexia
- Specialty: Neurology

Hyporeflexia is the reduction or absence of normal bodily reflexes. It can be detected through the use of a reflex hammer and is the opposite of hyperreflexia.

Hyporeflexia is generally associated with a deficit in the lower motor neurons (at the alpha motor neurons from the spinal cord to a muscle), whereas hyperreflexia is often attributed to lesions in the upper motor neurons (along the long, motor tracts from the brain). The upper motor neurons are thought to inhibit the reflex arc, which is formed by sensory neurons from intrafusal fibers of muscles, lower motor neurons (including alpha and gamma motor fibers) and appurtenant interneurons. Therefore, damage to lower motor neurons will subsequently result in hyporeflexia and/or areflexia.

In spinal shock, which is commonly seen in the transection of the spinal cord, hyporeflexia can transiently occur below the level of the lesion and can later become hyperreflexic. Cases of severe muscle atrophy or destruction may render the muscle too weak to show any reflex and should not be confused with a neuronal cause.

Hyporeflexia may have other causes, including hypothyroidism, electrolyte imbalance (e.g., excess magnesium), and drug use (e.g, depressants).

Diseases associated with hyporeflexia include:

- Centronuclear myopathy
- Guillain–Barré syndrome
- Lambert-Eaton myasthenic syndrome
- Hypothyroidism
- Polyneuropathy (achilles and plantar reflexes)
- Friedreich's Ataxia

== See also ==
- Hyperreflexia
- MEGF10
