= Spinal shock =

Loss of sensation and paralysis following a spinal cord injury

Spinal shock was first explored by Robert Whytt in 1750 as a loss of sensation accompanied by motor paralysis with initial loss but gradual recovery of reflexes, following a spinal cord injury (SCI) – most often a complete transection. Reflexes in the spinal cord below the level of injury are depressed (hyporeflexia) or absent (areflexia), while those above the level of the injury remain unaffected. The 'shock' in spinal shock does not refer to circulatory collapse, and should not be confused with neurogenic shock, which is life-threatening. The term "spinal shock" was introduced more than 150 years ago in an attempt to distinguish arterial hypotension due to a hemorrhagic source from arterial hypotension due to loss of sympathetic tone resulting from spinal cord injury. Whytt, however, may have discussed the same phenomenon a century earlier, although no descriptive term was assigned.

== Phases of spinal shock ==
Phase	Time	Physical exam finding	Underlying physiological event
1	0–1d	Areflexia/Hyporeflexia	Loss of descending facilitation
2	1–3d	Initial reflex return	Denervation supersensitivity
3	1–4w	Hyperreflexia (initial)	Axon-supported synapse growth
4	1–12m	Hyperreflexia, Spasticity	Soma-supported synapse growth

Ditunno et al. proposed a four-phase model for spinal shock in 2004 as follows:

Phase 1 is characterized by a complete loss—or weakening—of all reflexes below the SCI. This phase lasts for a day. The neurons involved in various reflex arcs normally receive a basal level of excitatory stimulation from the brain. After an SCI, these cells lose this input, and the neurons involved become hyperpolarized and therefore less responsive to stimuli.

Phase 2 occurs over the next two days, and is characterized by the return of some, but not all, reflexes below the SCI. The first reflexes to reappear are polysynaptic in nature, such as the bulbocavernosus reflex. Monosynaptic reflexes, such as the deep tendon reflexes, are not restored until Phase 3. Restoration of reflexes is not rostral to caudal as previously (and commonly) believed, but instead proceeds from polysynaptic to monosynaptic. The reason reflexes return is the hypersensitivity of reflex muscles following denervation – more receptors for neurotransmitters are expressed and are therefore easier to stimulate.

Phases 3 and 4 are characterized by hyperreflexia, or abnormally strong reflexes usually produced with minimal stimulation. Interneurons and lower motor neurons below the SCI begin sprouting, attempting to re-establish synapses. The first synapses to form are from shorter axons, usually from interneurons – this categorizes Phase 3. Phase 4 on the other hand, is soma-mediated, and will take longer for the soma to transport various growth factors, including proteins, to the end of the axon.

== Autonomic effects ==
In spinal cord injuries above T6, neurogenic shock may occur, from the loss of autonomic innervation from the brain. Parasympathetic is preserved but the synergy between sympathetic and parasympathetic system is lost in cervical and high thoracic SCI lesions. Sacral parasympathetic loss may be encountered in lesions below T6 or T7. Cervical lesions cause total loss of sympathetic innervation and lead to vasovagal hypotension and bradyarrhythmias – which resolve in 3–6 weeks. Autonomic dysreflexia is permanent, and occurs from Phase 4 onwards. It is characterized by unchecked sympathetic stimulation below the SCI (from a loss of cranial regulation), leading to often extreme hypertension, loss of bladder or bowel control, sweating, headaches, and other sympathetic effects.
