= Hyperreflexia =

Overactive bodily reflexes

- Other names: Hyper-reflexia
- Specialty: Neurology

Hyperreflexia is overactive or overresponsive bodily reflexes. Examples of this include twitching and spastic tendencies, which indicate disease of the upper motor neurons and the lessening or loss of control ordinarily exerted by higher brain centers of lower neural pathways. It is the opposite of hyporeflexia.

Spinal cord injury is the most common cause of hyperreflexia. Standard stimuli, such as the filling of the bladder, can cause excessive responses from the nervous system. The causes of hyperreflexia are not known.

Hyperreflexia also has many other causes, including the side effects of drugs (e.g., stimulants), hyperthyroidism, electrolyte imbalance, serotonin syndrome, severe brain trauma, multiple sclerosis, Reye syndrome, and pre-eclampsia.

Recovery from hyperreflexia can occur several hours to several months after a spinal cord injury; the phase of recovery is likely to occur in stages rather than on a continuum. The late stage is between two weeks and several months. Patients with a severe spinal cord injury mainly present with a later stage of recovery because during the early stages they present with spinal shock. Reflex and motor recovery can sometimes occur simultaneously.

== See also ==
- Hyporeflexia
- Autonomic dysreflexia
