= MEGF10 =

Protein-coding gene in the species Homo sapiens

Identifiers
- Aliases: MEGF10, EMARDD, multiple EGF like domains 10, SR-F3
- External IDs: OMIM: 612453; MGI: 2685177; GeneCards: MEGF10

Gene location (Human)
| Chr. | Chromosome 5 (human) |
| Band | 5q23.2 | Start | 127,290,796 bp |
| Band | 5q23.2 | End | 127,465,737 bp |

Gene location (Mouse)
| Chr. | Chromosome 18 (mouse) |
| Band | 18|18 D3 | Start | 57,266,162 bp |
| Band | 18|18 D3 | End | 57,430,539 bp |
RNA expression pattern
| Bgee | Human / Mouse (ortholog); Top expressed in: corpus callosum; ventricular zone; external globus pallidus; inferior ganglion of vagus nerve; endothelial cell; subthalamic nucleus; internal globus pallidus; Brodmann area 23; tibia; pars reticulata / Top expressed in: otolith organ; utricle; trigeminal ganglion; substantia nigra; ventricular zone; globus pallidus; deep cerebellar nuclei; lobe of cerebellum; cerebellar vermis; vestibular sensory epithelium; More reference expression data |
| BioGPS | n/a |
Gene ontology
| Molecular function | complement component C1q complex binding; scavenger receptor activity; Notch binding |
| Cellular component | integral component of membrane; cell projection; membrane; phagocytic cup; plasma membrane |
| Biological process | skeletal muscle satellite cell differentiation; regulation of skeletal muscle tissue development; homotypic cell-cell adhesion; recognition of apoptotic cell; muscle organ development; skeletal muscle satellite cell activation; cell adhesion; muscle cell development; regulation of muscle cell differentiation; skeletal muscle satellite cell proliferation; phagocytosis; receptor-mediated endocytosis; muscle cell proliferation; engulfment of apoptotic cell; myoblast migration; apoptotic process involved in development; apoptotic cell clearance |
Sources:Amigo / QuickGO
Orthologs
| Databases | NCBI: entry; OMA: entry |
| Species | Human | Mouse |
| Entrez | 84466 | 70417 |
| Ensembl | ENSG00000145794 | ENSMUSG00000024593 |
| UniProt | Q96KG7 | Q6DIB5 |
| RefSeq (mRNA) | NM_001256545; NM_001308119; NM_001308121; NM_032446 | NM_001001979 |
| RefSeq (protein) | NP_001243474; NP_001295048; NP_001295050; NP_115822 | NP_001001979 |
| Location (UCSC) | Chr 5: 127.29 – 127.47 Mb | Chr 18: 57.27 – 57.43 Mb |
| PubMed search |
- Wikidata
| View/Edit Human | View/Edit Mouse |

Multiple EGF-like-domains 10 is a protein that in humans is encoded by the MEGF10 gene.

MEGF10 is a regulator of satellite cell myogenesis and interacts with Notch1 in myoblasts. It has been shown to be the cause of early-onset myopathy, areflexia, respiratory distress and dysphagia.

MEGF10 and MEGF11, have critical roles in the formation of mosaics by two retinal interneuron subtypes, starburst amacrine cells and horizontal cells in mice. These cells are less likely to be near neighbours of the same subtype than would occur by chance, resulting in 'exclusion zones' that separate them. Mosaic arrangements provide a mechanism to distribute each cell type evenly across the retina, ensuring that all parts of the visual field have access to a full set of processing elements.
