= Diaphragmatic breathing =

Form of breathing done by contracting the diaphragm

Animation of diaphragmatic breathing with the diaphragm shown in green

Belly expanding and contracting during this type of breathing

Diaphragmatic breathing, abdominal breathing, belly breathing, or deep breathing, is a breathing technique performed by contracting the diaphragm, a muscle located horizontally between the thoracic cavity and abdominal cavity.

== Definition ==
Diaphragmatic breathing involves using the diaphragm to take deep breaths, allowing the lungs to expand to full capacity and enable optimal efficiency for respiration. Because diaphragmatic breathing causes descent of the diaphragm into the abdominal cavity, it is also called abdominal breathing or belly breathing.

The method involves breathing in slowly through the nose, letting the air in deeply, then tightening the abdominal muscles while exhaling through pursed lips.

== Clinical applications ==
Diaphragmatic breathing is used as an adjunct intervention in several clinical contexts, particularly in people with respiratory diseases, such as chronic obstructive pulmonary disease (COPD) and asthma. Diaphragmatic breathing helps with shortness of breath in such affected people. Evidence for its effectiveness in exercise tolerance by people with COPD is mixed.

Diaphragmatic breathing exercises are used for cognitive behavioral therapy in people with anxiety disorders, stress, and panic disorder. Diaphragmatic breathing may help with relaxation, lower blood pressure, and reduce heart rate.

== See also ==
- Buteyko method
- Circular breathing
- Kussmaul breathing
- Pranayama – a traditional Yogic practice of slowing and extending the breaths, used during meditation
- Shallow breathing – a type of breathing that is mutually exclusive to diaphragmatic breathing and is associated with multiple anxiety disorders
- Wim Hof method
- Complete breathing
