= Blunt cardiac injury =

Myocardial contusion
- Specialty: Cardiology, Cardiothoracic Surgery, Emergency medicine

A blunt cardiac injury is an injury to the heart as the result of blunt trauma, typically to the anterior chest wall. It can result in a variety of specific injuries to the heart, the most common of which is a myocardial contusion, which is a term for a bruise (contusion) to the heart after an injury. Other injuries which can result include septal defects and valvular failures. The right ventricle is thought to be most commonly affected due to its anatomic location as the most anterior surface of the heart. Myocardial contusion is not a specific diagnosis and the extent of the injury can vary greatly. Usually, there are other chest injuries seen with a myocardial contusion such as rib fractures, pneumothorax, and heart valve injury. When a myocardial contusion is suspected, consideration must be given to any other chest injuries, which will likely be determined by clinical signs, tests, and imaging.

The signs and symptoms of a myocardial contusion can manifest in different ways in people which may also be masked by the other injuries. It is recommended that people with blunt chest trauma receive an electrocardiogram to determine if there are any irregularities with cardiac function. The presentation of an abnormal heart rhythm after sustaining a myocardial contusion can be delayed for up to 72 hours.

== Etiology ==
The most common cause of blunt cardiac injury (BCI) is due to motor vehicle collisions. In evaluating causes for BCI, it is important to understand how the heart is situated within the thorax. It is protected to a certain degree by bony structures like the sternum, ribs and spine, thereby offering it significant protection and thus requiring substantial amounts of force to cause BCI. Motor vehicle collisions are implicated in most causes of BCI as significant deceleration can result in the heart tearing from its attachments to surrounding structures. There should be a high index of suspicion for BCI when evaluating injuries to the thoraco-abdominal area.

== Pathophysiology ==
Possible mechanisms for BCI include direct, indirect, bidirectional, deceleration, blast, crush, concussive, or combined. A direct injury is the most common and occurs most likely near the end of diastole, during ventricular filling. Indirect injury results from increased preload on the heart secondary to spikes in venous circulation which can then lead to rupture of the heart. Bidirectional injuries are a result of compressive forces on the heart by both the spine and the sternum. Deceleration injuries occur when the heart is forcibly torn from its attachments, thereby leading to tears of the muscle and arteries.

Commotio cordis is a condition seen in young, male athletes that results from BCI, and leads to sudden cardiac death within the context of benign changes of the heart on autopsy and no preexisting conditions. The impact of BCI in this condition likely puts the heart in ventricular fibrillation, thereby resulting in death.

Structural and electrical disturbances are typical of BCI. Examples of structural injuries include intramural hematomas (which are benign and self-limiting in most cases), papillary muscle rupture, and septal injuries. Common electrical disturbances include premature ventricular contraction and transient bundle branch blocks. It is important for the clinician to monitor the patient’s EKG and conduct a thorough cardiovascular exam to evaluate for murmurs and abnormal heart sounds in these cases.

== Signs and symptoms ==
In evaluating the patient with suspected BCI, important symptoms to look for include chest pain, shortness of breath, palpitations and at times, typical anginal symptoms. Cardiac risk factors can also help stratify the possibilities of such an injury. Medication histories should also be noted, as rhythm control agents can mask tachycardias that normally present with BCI.

Common physical exam findings include tachypnea, abnormal lung sounds, tenderness to palpation of the chest wall, bruising, and fractures.

== Evaluation ==
An ECG is recommended in those with possible BCI. Abnormal ECG findings should prompt the clinician to then place the patient on continuous telemetry monitoring. Troponin levels should also be ordered. Negative findings on both ECG and troponin levels do not exclude BCI, as symptoms may present later. If both ECG and troponin levels are abnormal, an appropriate next step in evaluation would involve ordering an echocardiography.

== Treatment and management ==
An abnormal ECG and elevated troponin levels should elicit continued cardiac monitoring to look for possible arrhythmias or cardiac failure. If an arrhythmia is found, the patient should be treated as if he/she is a non-BCI patient with repletion of electrolytes, monitoring of acid-base status, and administration of medications as indicated. If clinical evaluation deems a patient severely compromised, an urgent cardiology evaluation must be made. Surgical intervention may also be required in some situations (rupture, tamponade), with pericardiocentesis as an appropriate next step in management.

== Complications ==
Complications for BCI are rare but can include delayed rupture of the heart, complete AV block, heart failure, pericardial effusion and constrictive pericarditis. It is advised that patients thus be reevaluated in 3-6 months post-injury.

== See also ==
- Commotio cordis
