= Shallow breathing =

Form of breathing

Fig. 6: Shallow breathing using rib muscles

Shallow breathing, thoracic breathing, costal breathing or chest breathing is the drawing of minimal breath into the lungs, usually by drawing air into the chest area using the intercostal muscles rather than throughout the lungs via the diaphragm. Shallow breathing can result in or be symptomatic of rapid breathing and hypoventilation. Most people who breathe shallowly do it throughout the day and they are almost always unaware of the condition.

Animation of clavicular breathing.

In upper lobar breathing, clavicular breathing, or clavicle breathing, air is drawn predominantly into the chest by the raising of the shoulders and collarbone (clavicles), and simultaneous contracting of the abdomen during inhalation. A maximum amount of air can be drawn this way only for short periods of time, since it requires persistent effort.

== Conditions ==
Several conditions are marked by shallow breathing, including: anxiety disorders, asthma, hyperventilation, pneumonia, pulmonary edema, and shock.

Overly shallow breathing, also known as hypopnea, may result in hypoventilation. During sleep, breathing originates from the diaphragm, which is sometimes impaired in people with neuromuscular disorders or central sleep apnea.

== See also ==
- Diaphragmatic breathing
- Rapid shallow breathing index
- Thoracic cavity
