= Distributive shock =

Insufficient blood flow due to abnormal distribution in the capillaries

- Specialty: Critical care medicine

Distributive shock is a medical condition in which abnormal distribution of blood flow in the smallest blood vessels results in inadequate supply of blood to the body's tissues and organs. It is one of four categories of shock, a condition where there is not enough oxygen-carrying blood to meet the metabolic needs of the cells which make up the body's tissues and organs. Distributive shock is different from the other three categories of shock in that it occurs even though the output of the heart is at or above a normal level. The most common cause is sepsis leading to a type of distributive shock called septic shock, a condition that can be fatal.

== Types ==
Elbers and Ince have identified five classes of abnormal microcirculatory flow in distributive shock using side stream dark field microscopy.

- Class I: all capillaries are stagnant when there is normal or sluggish venular flow.
- Class II: there are empty capillaries next to capillaries that have flowing red blood cells.
- Class III: there are stagnant capillaries next to capillaries with normal blood flow.
- Class IV: hyperdynamic flow in capillaries adjacent to capillaries that are stagnant.
- Class V: widespread hyperdynamic flow in the microcirculatory system.

According to the cause, there are 4 types of distributive shock:

- Neurogenic shock: Decreased sympathetic stimulation leading to decreased vessel tone.
- Anaphylactic shock
- Septic shock
- Shock due to adrenal crisis

== Causes ==
In addition to sepsis, distributive shock can be caused by systemic inflammatory response syndrome (SIRS) due to conditions other than infection such as pancreatitis, burns or trauma. Other causes include toxic shock syndrome (TSS), anaphylaxis (a sudden, severe allergic reaction), adrenal insufficiency, reactions to drugs or toxins, heavy metal poisoning, hepatic (liver) insufficiency and damage to the central nervous system. Causes of adrenal insufficiency leading to distributive shock include acute worsening of chronic adrenal insufficiency, destruction or removal of the adrenal glands, suppression of adrenal gland function due to exogenous steroids, hypopituitarism and metabolic failure of hormone production.

== Pathophysiology ==
The cause of inadequate tissue perfusion (blood delivery to tissues) in distributive shock is a lack of normal responsiveness of blood vessels to vasoconstrictive agents and direct vasodilation.

There are four types of distributive shock. The most common, septic shock, is caused by an infection, most frequently by bacteria, but viruses, fungi and parasites have been implicated. Infection sites most likely to lead to septic shock are chest, abdomen and genitourinary tract. In septic shock the blood flow in the microvasculature is abnormal with some capillaries underperfused and others with normal to high blood flow. The endothelial cells lining the blood vessels become less responsive to vasoconstrictive agents, lose their glycocalyx (normal coating) and negative ionic charge, become leaky and cause extensive over-expression of nitric oxide. The coagulation cascade is also disrupted. Tissue factor that initiates the clotting cascade is produced by activated monocytes and the endothelial cells lining the blood vessels while antithrombin and fibrinolysis are impaired. Disseminated intravascular coagulation (DIC) can result from the thrombin produced in the inflammatory response. The ability of red blood cells to change shape decreases and their tendency to clump together increases, inhibiting their flow through the microvasculature.

In anaphylactic shock low blood pressure is related to decreased systemic vascular resistance (SVR) triggered primarily by a massive release of histamine by mast cells activated by antigen-bound immunoglobulin E and also by increased production and release of prostaglandins.

Neurogenic shock is caused by the loss of vascular tone normally supported by the sympathetic nervous system due to injury to the central nervous system especially spinal cord injury. Rupture of a hollow organ, with subsequent evacuation of contents in the peritoneal cavity could also determine neurogenic shock, a subtype of distributive shock. This happens due to the widespread peritoneal irritation by the ruptured viscus contents, as in peptic ulcer perforation, with consequent strong vagal activation, and generalized, extensive peripheral vasodilation and bradycardia. Thus, in neurogenic shock, there is decreased systemic vascular resistance, CVP is typically decreased, CO decreased or normal, and PAOP decreased.

Distributive shock associated with adrenal crisis results from inadequate steroid hormones.

== Treatment ==
The main goals of treatment in distributive shock are to reverse the underlying cause and achieve hemodynamic stabilization. Immediate treatment involves fluid resuscitation and the use of vasoactive drugs, both vasopressors and inotropes. Hydrocortisone is used for people whose hypotension does not respond to fluid resuscitation and vasopressors. Opening and keeping open the microcirculation is a consideration in the treatment of distributive shock, as a result limiting the use of vasopressors has been suggested. Control of inflammation, vascular function and coagulation to correct pathological differences in blood flow and microvascular shunting has been pointed to as a potentially important adjunct goal in the treatment of distributive shock.

People with septic shock are treated with antimicrobial drugs to treat the causative infection. Some sources of infection require surgical intervention including necrotizing fasciitis, cholangitis, abscess, intestinal ischemia, or infected medical devices.

Anaphylactic shock is treated with epinephrine. The use of vasopressin together with norepinephrine rather than norepinephrine alone appears to decrease the risk of atrial fibrillation but with few other benefits.

== Prognosis ==
Septic shock is associated with significant mortality and is the leading non-cardiac cause of death in intensive care units (ICUs).

== Research directions ==
The choice of fluids for resuscitation remains an area of research, the Surviving Sepsis Campaign an international consortium of experts, did not find adequate evidence to support the superiority of crystalloid fluids versus colloid fluids. Drugs such as pyridoxalated hemoglobin polyoxyethylene, which scavenge nitric oxide from the blood, have been investigated, as well as methylene blue which may inhibit the nitric oxide-cyclic guanosine monophosphate (NO-cGMP) pathway which has been suggested to play a significant role in distributive shock.
