= Respiratory adaptation =

Breathing changes caused by exertion

Respiratory adaptation is the specific change that the respiratory system undergoes in response to the demands of physical exertion. Intense physical exertion, such as that involved in fitness training, places elevated demands on the respiratory system. Over time, this results in respiratory changes as the system adapts to these requirements. These changes ultimately result in an increased exchange of oxygen and carbon dioxide, which is accompanied by an increase in metabolism. Respiratory adaptation is a physiological determinant of peak endurance performance, and in elite athletes, the pulmonary system is often a limiting factor to exercise under certain conditions.

== Neural control ==
Respiratory adaptation begins almost immediately after the initiation of the physical stress associated with exercise. This triggers signals from the motor cortex that stimulate the respiratory center of the brain stem, in conjunction with feedback from the proprioreceptors in the muscles and joints of the active limbs.

== Breathing rate ==
With higher intensity training, breathing rate is increased in order to allow more air to move in and out of the lungs, which enhances gas exchange. Endurance training typically results in an increase in the respiration rate.

== Lung capacity ==
With adaptation, lung capacity increases, allowing a greater quantity of air to move in and out. Endurance training typically results in an increase in tidal volume.

== Respiratory muscles ==
Muscles involved in respiration, including the diaphragm and intercostal muscles, increase in strength and endurance. This results in an improved ability to breathe in more air, for longer amounts of time with less fatigue. Aerobic training typically improves the endurance of respiratory muscles, whereas anaerobic training tends to increase the size and strength of respiratory muscles.

== Lung capillaries ==
Exercise increases the vascularization of the lungs. This allows the more blood flow in and out of the lungs. This enhances the uptake of oxygen, since there is greater surface area for blood to bind with haemoglobin.

== Alveoli ==
Respiratory adaptation results an increase in the number of alveoli, which enables more gas exchange to occur. This is coupled with an increase in alveolar oxygen tension.
