= Bucket handle movement =

Respiratory movement

Bucket-handle is a movement of ribs that results in change in transverse diameter of the thorax.

== Definition ==
One of the most important functions of ribs and diaphragm is the change in volume of thorax that helps inspiration and expiration. In general, the ribs move around two axes. As the anterior end of ribs is about 4 cm lower than the posterior end, the middle part of rib is lower than anterior and posterior ends. Movement at costovertebral joints 7 to 10 about an anteroposterior axis results in raising and lowering the middle of the rib, the Bucket-handle movement. In elevation, this increases the transverse diameter of the thorax.

== See also ==
- Pump handle movement
