= Pump handle movement =

Respiratory movement

Pump-handle is a movement of the ribs that results in a change in the anteroposterior diameter of the thorax.

== Definition ==
One of the most important functions of the ribs and diaphragm is the change in volume of the thorax that helps inspiration and expiration. In general, the ribs move around two axes. The anterior end of the rib is lower than the posterior end; therefore, during elevation of the rib, the anterior end also moves forwards. Movement at costovertebral joints 2 to 6 about a side-to-side axis results in raising and lowering the sternal end of the rib, the "pump-handle" movement. This occurs mostly in the vertebrosternal ribs. In elevation, this increases the anteroposterior diameter of the thorax.

== See also ==
- Bucket handle movement
